

385001–385100 

|-bgcolor=#d6d6d6
| 385001 ||  || — || November 20, 2001 || Kitt Peak || Spacewatch || — || align=right | 3.6 km || 
|-id=002 bgcolor=#E9E9E9
| 385002 ||  || — || November 16, 2003 || Kitt Peak || Spacewatch || HEN || align=right | 1.2 km || 
|-id=003 bgcolor=#E9E9E9
| 385003 ||  || — || October 6, 1999 || Socorro || LINEAR || — || align=right | 1.7 km || 
|-id=004 bgcolor=#d6d6d6
| 385004 ||  || — || September 16, 2001 || Socorro || LINEAR || — || align=right | 4.3 km || 
|-id=005 bgcolor=#d6d6d6
| 385005 ||  || — || November 1, 2008 || Mount Lemmon || Mount Lemmon Survey || — || align=right | 2.8 km || 
|-id=006 bgcolor=#E9E9E9
| 385006 ||  || — || October 29, 2003 || Kitt Peak || Spacewatch || AGN || align=right | 1.4 km || 
|-id=007 bgcolor=#E9E9E9
| 385007 ||  || — || November 19, 2008 || Kitt Peak || Spacewatch || — || align=right | 3.2 km || 
|-id=008 bgcolor=#E9E9E9
| 385008 ||  || — || May 26, 2006 || Mount Lemmon || Mount Lemmon Survey || — || align=right | 3.0 km || 
|-id=009 bgcolor=#E9E9E9
| 385009 ||  || — || April 24, 2006 || Kitt Peak || Spacewatch || HOF || align=right | 2.6 km || 
|-id=010 bgcolor=#d6d6d6
| 385010 ||  || — || September 19, 2006 || Catalina || CSS || — || align=right | 3.7 km || 
|-id=011 bgcolor=#d6d6d6
| 385011 ||  || — || September 19, 2007 || Kitt Peak || Spacewatch || K-2 || align=right | 1.4 km || 
|-id=012 bgcolor=#d6d6d6
| 385012 ||  || — || October 10, 2007 || Mount Lemmon || Mount Lemmon Survey || — || align=right | 2.4 km || 
|-id=013 bgcolor=#E9E9E9
| 385013 ||  || — || March 14, 2010 || Mount Lemmon || Mount Lemmon Survey || — || align=right | 2.5 km || 
|-id=014 bgcolor=#E9E9E9
| 385014 ||  || — || September 29, 2003 || Kitt Peak || Spacewatch || — || align=right | 2.0 km || 
|-id=015 bgcolor=#E9E9E9
| 385015 ||  || — || February 1, 2005 || Kitt Peak || Spacewatch || — || align=right | 2.3 km || 
|-id=016 bgcolor=#d6d6d6
| 385016 ||  || — || November 4, 2007 || Mount Lemmon || Mount Lemmon Survey || — || align=right | 2.8 km || 
|-id=017 bgcolor=#E9E9E9
| 385017 ||  || — || September 5, 1999 || Kitt Peak || Spacewatch || — || align=right | 1.3 km || 
|-id=018 bgcolor=#E9E9E9
| 385018 ||  || — || October 18, 2003 || Kitt Peak || Spacewatch || — || align=right | 2.0 km || 
|-id=019 bgcolor=#E9E9E9
| 385019 ||  || — || February 3, 2000 || Kitt Peak || Spacewatch || AST || align=right | 1.6 km || 
|-id=020 bgcolor=#d6d6d6
| 385020 ||  || — || September 15, 2007 || Kitt Peak || Spacewatch || CHA || align=right | 2.3 km || 
|-id=021 bgcolor=#E9E9E9
| 385021 ||  || — || November 22, 2009 || Mount Lemmon || Mount Lemmon Survey || — || align=right | 2.0 km || 
|-id=022 bgcolor=#E9E9E9
| 385022 ||  || — || April 30, 2006 || Kitt Peak || Spacewatch || NEM || align=right | 2.4 km || 
|-id=023 bgcolor=#d6d6d6
| 385023 ||  || — || November 2, 2007 || Kitt Peak || Spacewatch || — || align=right | 3.2 km || 
|-id=024 bgcolor=#d6d6d6
| 385024 ||  || — || September 20, 2001 || Socorro || LINEAR || HYG || align=right | 2.9 km || 
|-id=025 bgcolor=#d6d6d6
| 385025 ||  || — || September 27, 2006 || Catalina || CSS || — || align=right | 3.3 km || 
|-id=026 bgcolor=#d6d6d6
| 385026 ||  || — || December 30, 2007 || Kitt Peak || Spacewatch || 7:4 || align=right | 4.0 km || 
|-id=027 bgcolor=#d6d6d6
| 385027 ||  || — || August 21, 2006 || Kitt Peak || Spacewatch || VER || align=right | 2.5 km || 
|-id=028 bgcolor=#E9E9E9
| 385028 ||  || — || October 24, 2008 || Kitt Peak || Spacewatch || — || align=right | 1.8 km || 
|-id=029 bgcolor=#d6d6d6
| 385029 ||  || — || May 3, 2010 || Kitt Peak || Spacewatch || — || align=right | 3.4 km || 
|-id=030 bgcolor=#E9E9E9
| 385030 ||  || — || November 21, 2008 || Mount Lemmon || Mount Lemmon Survey || — || align=right | 1.7 km || 
|-id=031 bgcolor=#d6d6d6
| 385031 ||  || — || September 30, 2006 || Mount Lemmon || Mount Lemmon Survey || — || align=right | 2.9 km || 
|-id=032 bgcolor=#d6d6d6
| 385032 ||  || — || March 1, 2009 || Mount Lemmon || Mount Lemmon Survey || EOS || align=right | 2.6 km || 
|-id=033 bgcolor=#E9E9E9
| 385033 ||  || — || October 17, 2003 || Kitt Peak || Spacewatch || — || align=right | 2.6 km || 
|-id=034 bgcolor=#E9E9E9
| 385034 ||  || — || February 10, 2010 || Kitt Peak || Spacewatch || — || align=right | 1.4 km || 
|-id=035 bgcolor=#d6d6d6
| 385035 ||  || — || October 18, 1995 || Kitt Peak || Spacewatch || — || align=right | 3.1 km || 
|-id=036 bgcolor=#E9E9E9
| 385036 ||  || — || November 30, 1999 || Kitt Peak || Spacewatch || HEN || align=right | 1.1 km || 
|-id=037 bgcolor=#E9E9E9
| 385037 ||  || — || October 18, 2003 || Anderson Mesa || LONEOS || — || align=right | 2.1 km || 
|-id=038 bgcolor=#E9E9E9
| 385038 ||  || — || September 29, 2003 || Kitt Peak || Spacewatch || — || align=right | 2.2 km || 
|-id=039 bgcolor=#d6d6d6
| 385039 ||  || — || October 17, 2001 || Socorro || LINEAR || — || align=right | 3.2 km || 
|-id=040 bgcolor=#E9E9E9
| 385040 ||  || — || October 19, 2003 || Kitt Peak || Spacewatch || — || align=right | 2.0 km || 
|-id=041 bgcolor=#d6d6d6
| 385041 ||  || — || April 2, 2005 || Kitt Peak || Spacewatch || — || align=right | 3.4 km || 
|-id=042 bgcolor=#d6d6d6
| 385042 ||  || — || April 14, 2004 || Kitt Peak || Spacewatch || — || align=right | 3.1 km || 
|-id=043 bgcolor=#fefefe
| 385043 ||  || — || April 18, 1996 || Kitt Peak || Spacewatch || V || align=right data-sort-value="0.94" | 940 m || 
|-id=044 bgcolor=#fefefe
| 385044 ||  || — || January 28, 2007 || Mount Lemmon || Mount Lemmon Survey || NYS || align=right data-sort-value="0.93" | 930 m || 
|-id=045 bgcolor=#E9E9E9
| 385045 ||  || — || August 24, 2007 || Kitt Peak || Spacewatch || WIT || align=right data-sort-value="0.85" | 850 m || 
|-id=046 bgcolor=#d6d6d6
| 385046 ||  || — || September 14, 2007 || Mount Lemmon || Mount Lemmon Survey || — || align=right | 3.6 km || 
|-id=047 bgcolor=#E9E9E9
| 385047 ||  || — || April 22, 1998 || Kitt Peak || Spacewatch || — || align=right data-sort-value="0.94" | 940 m || 
|-id=048 bgcolor=#d6d6d6
| 385048 ||  || — || October 23, 2006 || Kitt Peak || Spacewatch || — || align=right | 3.1 km || 
|-id=049 bgcolor=#E9E9E9
| 385049 ||  || — || November 30, 2008 || Kitt Peak || Spacewatch || — || align=right | 2.7 km || 
|-id=050 bgcolor=#d6d6d6
| 385050 ||  || — || March 23, 2004 || Kitt Peak || Spacewatch || — || align=right | 3.1 km || 
|-id=051 bgcolor=#E9E9E9
| 385051 ||  || — || December 25, 2005 || Mount Lemmon || Mount Lemmon Survey || — || align=right | 1.5 km || 
|-id=052 bgcolor=#d6d6d6
| 385052 ||  || — || October 15, 1995 || Kitt Peak || Spacewatch || VER || align=right | 3.1 km || 
|-id=053 bgcolor=#E9E9E9
| 385053 ||  || — || November 4, 1996 || Kitt Peak || Spacewatch || — || align=right | 1.5 km || 
|-id=054 bgcolor=#E9E9E9
| 385054 ||  || — || February 20, 2006 || Kitt Peak || Spacewatch || MIS || align=right | 3.3 km || 
|-id=055 bgcolor=#d6d6d6
| 385055 ||  || — || April 13, 2004 || Kitt Peak || Spacewatch || — || align=right | 2.6 km || 
|-id=056 bgcolor=#E9E9E9
| 385056 ||  || — || October 13, 2007 || Mount Lemmon || Mount Lemmon Survey || — || align=right | 2.9 km || 
|-id=057 bgcolor=#d6d6d6
| 385057 ||  || — || September 17, 2006 || Kitt Peak || Spacewatch || — || align=right | 3.1 km || 
|-id=058 bgcolor=#d6d6d6
| 385058 ||  || — || September 17, 2006 || Catalina || CSS || URS || align=right | 3.4 km || 
|-id=059 bgcolor=#d6d6d6
| 385059 ||  || — || September 19, 2001 || Socorro || LINEAR || — || align=right | 2.9 km || 
|-id=060 bgcolor=#d6d6d6
| 385060 ||  || — || March 29, 2009 || Mount Lemmon || Mount Lemmon Survey || SYL7:4 || align=right | 4.3 km || 
|-id=061 bgcolor=#E9E9E9
| 385061 ||  || — || September 19, 2007 || Kitt Peak || Spacewatch || — || align=right | 2.5 km || 
|-id=062 bgcolor=#d6d6d6
| 385062 ||  || — || October 25, 2001 || Kitt Peak || Spacewatch || — || align=right | 2.3 km || 
|-id=063 bgcolor=#d6d6d6
| 385063 ||  || — || November 6, 1996 || Kitt Peak || Spacewatch || — || align=right | 3.3 km || 
|-id=064 bgcolor=#d6d6d6
| 385064 ||  || — || November 3, 2007 || Kitt Peak || Spacewatch || EOS || align=right | 2.2 km || 
|-id=065 bgcolor=#E9E9E9
| 385065 ||  || — || September 12, 2007 || Mount Lemmon || Mount Lemmon Survey || — || align=right | 2.1 km || 
|-id=066 bgcolor=#fefefe
| 385066 ||  || — || December 13, 2009 || Mount Lemmon || Mount Lemmon Survey || — || align=right | 1.1 km || 
|-id=067 bgcolor=#d6d6d6
| 385067 ||  || — || December 19, 2001 || Kitt Peak || Spacewatch || — || align=right | 4.3 km || 
|-id=068 bgcolor=#fefefe
| 385068 ||  || — || March 27, 2003 || Anderson Mesa || LONEOS || — || align=right | 1.1 km || 
|-id=069 bgcolor=#E9E9E9
| 385069 ||  || — || April 2, 2006 || Kitt Peak || Spacewatch || — || align=right | 1.6 km || 
|-id=070 bgcolor=#E9E9E9
| 385070 ||  || — || April 30, 1997 || Kitt Peak || Spacewatch || — || align=right | 2.1 km || 
|-id=071 bgcolor=#d6d6d6
| 385071 ||  || — || December 31, 2008 || Mount Lemmon || Mount Lemmon Survey || — || align=right | 3.0 km || 
|-id=072 bgcolor=#d6d6d6
| 385072 ||  || — || October 14, 2001 || Socorro || LINEAR || — || align=right | 4.2 km || 
|-id=073 bgcolor=#E9E9E9
| 385073 ||  || — || November 30, 2008 || Kitt Peak || Spacewatch || — || align=right | 2.0 km || 
|-id=074 bgcolor=#d6d6d6
| 385074 ||  || — || November 20, 2007 || Mount Lemmon || Mount Lemmon Survey || CRO || align=right | 2.7 km || 
|-id=075 bgcolor=#E9E9E9
| 385075 ||  || — || November 1, 1999 || Kitt Peak || Spacewatch || — || align=right | 2.4 km || 
|-id=076 bgcolor=#d6d6d6
| 385076 ||  || — || December 5, 2007 || Kitt Peak || Spacewatch || — || align=right | 3.5 km || 
|-id=077 bgcolor=#E9E9E9
| 385077 ||  || — || October 24, 2008 || Catalina || CSS || — || align=right | 1.5 km || 
|-id=078 bgcolor=#d6d6d6
| 385078 ||  || — || February 20, 2009 || Kitt Peak || Spacewatch || — || align=right | 2.7 km || 
|-id=079 bgcolor=#d6d6d6
| 385079 ||  || — || March 4, 2005 || Kitt Peak || Spacewatch || CHA || align=right | 2.3 km || 
|-id=080 bgcolor=#fefefe
| 385080 ||  || — || April 26, 2003 || Kitt Peak || Spacewatch || MAS || align=right data-sort-value="0.90" | 900 m || 
|-id=081 bgcolor=#d6d6d6
| 385081 ||  || — || September 30, 2006 || Mount Lemmon || Mount Lemmon Survey || HYG || align=right | 2.5 km || 
|-id=082 bgcolor=#E9E9E9
| 385082 ||  || — || March 7, 2005 || Socorro || LINEAR || — || align=right | 2.4 km || 
|-id=083 bgcolor=#d6d6d6
| 385083 ||  || — || September 12, 2001 || Kitt Peak || Spacewatch || — || align=right | 2.5 km || 
|-id=084 bgcolor=#d6d6d6
| 385084 ||  || — || November 15, 2007 || Catalina || CSS || — || align=right | 3.0 km || 
|-id=085 bgcolor=#d6d6d6
| 385085 ||  || — || November 11, 2001 || Kitt Peak || Spacewatch || HYG || align=right | 3.0 km || 
|-id=086 bgcolor=#E9E9E9
| 385086 ||  || — || November 21, 2008 || Kitt Peak || Spacewatch || — || align=right | 1.1 km || 
|-id=087 bgcolor=#E9E9E9
| 385087 ||  || — || November 9, 1996 || Kitt Peak || Spacewatch || — || align=right | 1.7 km || 
|-id=088 bgcolor=#d6d6d6
| 385088 ||  || — || June 24, 2011 || Mount Lemmon || Mount Lemmon Survey || — || align=right | 4.7 km || 
|-id=089 bgcolor=#E9E9E9
| 385089 ||  || — || May 5, 2010 || WISE || WISE || — || align=right | 4.8 km || 
|-id=090 bgcolor=#E9E9E9
| 385090 ||  || — || November 9, 2008 || Mount Lemmon || Mount Lemmon Survey || — || align=right | 2.0 km || 
|-id=091 bgcolor=#d6d6d6
| 385091 ||  || — || November 30, 2005 || Mount Lemmon || Mount Lemmon Survey || SHU3:2 || align=right | 6.2 km || 
|-id=092 bgcolor=#d6d6d6
| 385092 ||  || — || January 11, 1997 || Kitt Peak || Spacewatch || — || align=right | 4.0 km || 
|-id=093 bgcolor=#d6d6d6
| 385093 ||  || — || September 10, 2007 || Mount Lemmon || Mount Lemmon Survey || — || align=right | 2.3 km || 
|-id=094 bgcolor=#d6d6d6
| 385094 ||  || — || December 28, 2003 || Kitt Peak || Spacewatch || KOR || align=right | 1.5 km || 
|-id=095 bgcolor=#E9E9E9
| 385095 ||  || — || October 31, 2008 || Kitt Peak || Spacewatch || — || align=right | 1.7 km || 
|-id=096 bgcolor=#E9E9E9
| 385096 ||  || — || September 13, 2007 || Mount Lemmon || Mount Lemmon Survey || — || align=right | 1.8 km || 
|-id=097 bgcolor=#d6d6d6
| 385097 ||  || — || March 9, 2005 || Mount Lemmon || Mount Lemmon Survey || — || align=right | 3.7 km || 
|-id=098 bgcolor=#E9E9E9
| 385098 ||  || — || April 26, 2006 || Kitt Peak || Spacewatch || — || align=right | 2.4 km || 
|-id=099 bgcolor=#d6d6d6
| 385099 ||  || — || May 12, 2005 || Kitt Peak || Spacewatch || — || align=right | 2.5 km || 
|-id=100 bgcolor=#E9E9E9
| 385100 ||  || — || September 27, 2008 || Mount Lemmon || Mount Lemmon Survey || — || align=right | 1.7 km || 
|}

385101–385200 

|-bgcolor=#d6d6d6
| 385101 ||  || — || October 4, 2007 || Kitt Peak || Spacewatch || KOR || align=right | 1.3 km || 
|-id=102 bgcolor=#d6d6d6
| 385102 ||  || — || November 3, 2007 || Kitt Peak || Spacewatch || — || align=right | 2.3 km || 
|-id=103 bgcolor=#d6d6d6
| 385103 ||  || — || September 15, 2006 || Kitt Peak || Spacewatch || — || align=right | 2.4 km || 
|-id=104 bgcolor=#E9E9E9
| 385104 ||  || — || February 1, 2005 || Kitt Peak || Spacewatch || — || align=right | 2.6 km || 
|-id=105 bgcolor=#E9E9E9
| 385105 ||  || — || June 19, 2007 || Kitt Peak || Spacewatch || — || align=right | 1.3 km || 
|-id=106 bgcolor=#d6d6d6
| 385106 ||  || — || February 23, 2007 || Mount Lemmon || Mount Lemmon Survey || 3:2 || align=right | 4.1 km || 
|-id=107 bgcolor=#d6d6d6
| 385107 ||  || — || November 12, 1996 || Prescott || P. G. Comba || SHU3:2 || align=right | 5.7 km || 
|-id=108 bgcolor=#E9E9E9
| 385108 ||  || — || December 18, 1995 || Kitt Peak || Spacewatch || — || align=right | 1.8 km || 
|-id=109 bgcolor=#d6d6d6
| 385109 ||  || — || May 3, 2006 || Siding Spring || SSS || — || align=right | 4.6 km || 
|-id=110 bgcolor=#d6d6d6
| 385110 ||  || — || April 13, 2004 || Kitt Peak || Spacewatch || — || align=right | 3.5 km || 
|-id=111 bgcolor=#d6d6d6
| 385111 ||  || — || April 14, 2010 || Kitt Peak || Spacewatch || — || align=right | 3.4 km || 
|-id=112 bgcolor=#d6d6d6
| 385112 ||  || — || August 29, 2006 || Catalina || CSS || — || align=right | 2.9 km || 
|-id=113 bgcolor=#E9E9E9
| 385113 ||  || — || March 26, 2006 || Mount Lemmon || Mount Lemmon Survey || — || align=right | 1.9 km || 
|-id=114 bgcolor=#E9E9E9
| 385114 ||  || — || September 6, 1999 || Kitt Peak || Spacewatch || — || align=right | 1.8 km || 
|-id=115 bgcolor=#d6d6d6
| 385115 ||  || — || April 14, 2004 || Kitt Peak || Spacewatch || — || align=right | 2.9 km || 
|-id=116 bgcolor=#fefefe
| 385116 ||  || — || December 18, 2001 || Socorro || LINEAR || — || align=right | 1.1 km || 
|-id=117 bgcolor=#E9E9E9
| 385117 ||  || — || December 23, 2000 || Kitt Peak || Spacewatch || — || align=right | 1.9 km || 
|-id=118 bgcolor=#E9E9E9
| 385118 ||  || — || December 5, 2007 || Mount Lemmon || Mount Lemmon Survey || HOF || align=right | 3.6 km || 
|-id=119 bgcolor=#fefefe
| 385119 ||  || — || January 23, 2006 || Kitt Peak || Spacewatch || V || align=right data-sort-value="0.90" | 900 m || 
|-id=120 bgcolor=#d6d6d6
| 385120 ||  || — || December 4, 2007 || Mount Lemmon || Mount Lemmon Survey || VER || align=right | 3.7 km || 
|-id=121 bgcolor=#d6d6d6
| 385121 ||  || — || September 20, 2006 || Catalina || CSS || — || align=right | 4.2 km || 
|-id=122 bgcolor=#E9E9E9
| 385122 ||  || — || January 12, 1996 || Kitt Peak || Spacewatch || HEN || align=right | 1.3 km || 
|-id=123 bgcolor=#fefefe
| 385123 ||  || — || October 7, 2008 || Mount Lemmon || Mount Lemmon Survey || — || align=right | 1.3 km || 
|-id=124 bgcolor=#E9E9E9
| 385124 ||  || — || February 14, 2010 || Mount Lemmon || Mount Lemmon Survey || — || align=right | 2.3 km || 
|-id=125 bgcolor=#d6d6d6
| 385125 ||  || — || February 9, 2008 || Kitt Peak || Spacewatch || HYG || align=right | 3.4 km || 
|-id=126 bgcolor=#d6d6d6
| 385126 ||  || — || March 24, 2003 || Kitt Peak || Spacewatch || EOS || align=right | 2.3 km || 
|-id=127 bgcolor=#d6d6d6
| 385127 ||  || — || February 6, 1997 || Caussols || ODAS || SHU3:2 || align=right | 8.5 km || 
|-id=128 bgcolor=#d6d6d6
| 385128 ||  || — || April 25, 2003 || Anderson Mesa || LONEOS || — || align=right | 6.0 km || 
|-id=129 bgcolor=#C2FFFF
| 385129 ||  || — || February 14, 2002 || Kitt Peak || Spacewatch || L4 || align=right | 8.7 km || 
|-id=130 bgcolor=#d6d6d6
| 385130 ||  || — || February 28, 2006 || Mount Lemmon || Mount Lemmon Survey || 3:2 || align=right | 7.4 km || 
|-id=131 bgcolor=#d6d6d6
| 385131 ||  || — || March 12, 2007 || Catalina || CSS || Tj (2.92) || align=right | 4.5 km || 
|-id=132 bgcolor=#E9E9E9
| 385132 ||  || — || May 3, 2008 || Siding Spring || SSS || EUN || align=right | 1.8 km || 
|-id=133 bgcolor=#E9E9E9
| 385133 ||  || — || October 27, 2005 || Catalina || CSS || — || align=right | 1.1 km || 
|-id=134 bgcolor=#fefefe
| 385134 ||  || — || March 28, 2008 || Mount Lemmon || Mount Lemmon Survey || — || align=right | 1.2 km || 
|-id=135 bgcolor=#E9E9E9
| 385135 ||  || — || October 19, 1995 || Kitt Peak || Spacewatch || — || align=right | 2.6 km || 
|-id=136 bgcolor=#E9E9E9
| 385136 ||  || — || October 9, 2004 || Kitt Peak || Spacewatch || — || align=right | 2.6 km || 
|-id=137 bgcolor=#d6d6d6
| 385137 ||  || — || September 4, 2002 || Campo Imperatore || CINEOS || — || align=right | 4.2 km || 
|-id=138 bgcolor=#E9E9E9
| 385138 ||  || — || October 9, 2004 || Socorro || LINEAR || DOR || align=right | 3.4 km || 
|-id=139 bgcolor=#fefefe
| 385139 ||  || — || August 31, 2002 || Kitt Peak || Spacewatch || — || align=right data-sort-value="0.69" | 690 m || 
|-id=140 bgcolor=#E9E9E9
| 385140 ||  || — || November 28, 2005 || Catalina || CSS || MAR || align=right | 1.7 km || 
|-id=141 bgcolor=#E9E9E9
| 385141 ||  || — || December 2, 2004 || Kitt Peak || Spacewatch || — || align=right | 2.1 km || 
|-id=142 bgcolor=#E9E9E9
| 385142 ||  || — || April 20, 2007 || Mount Lemmon || Mount Lemmon Survey || — || align=right | 2.0 km || 
|-id=143 bgcolor=#E9E9E9
| 385143 ||  || — || March 13, 1999 || Kitt Peak || Spacewatch || MAR || align=right | 1.7 km || 
|-id=144 bgcolor=#fefefe
| 385144 ||  || — || November 24, 2000 || Anderson Mesa || LONEOS || — || align=right data-sort-value="0.77" | 770 m || 
|-id=145 bgcolor=#d6d6d6
| 385145 ||  || — || August 16, 2002 || Kitt Peak || Spacewatch || — || align=right | 3.7 km || 
|-id=146 bgcolor=#E9E9E9
| 385146 ||  || — || September 3, 2008 || Kitt Peak || Spacewatch || MRX || align=right | 1.0 km || 
|-id=147 bgcolor=#fefefe
| 385147 ||  || — || November 17, 2006 || Mount Lemmon || Mount Lemmon Survey || MAS || align=right | 1.0 km || 
|-id=148 bgcolor=#d6d6d6
| 385148 ||  || — || January 31, 2004 || Kitt Peak || Spacewatch || THM || align=right | 3.3 km || 
|-id=149 bgcolor=#E9E9E9
| 385149 ||  || — || January 31, 2006 || Siding Spring || SSS || — || align=right | 1.8 km || 
|-id=150 bgcolor=#E9E9E9
| 385150 ||  || — || July 3, 2008 || Catalina || CSS || — || align=right | 3.5 km || 
|-id=151 bgcolor=#d6d6d6
| 385151 ||  || — || May 22, 2006 || Kitt Peak || Spacewatch || — || align=right | 3.3 km || 
|-id=152 bgcolor=#d6d6d6
| 385152 ||  || — || March 15, 2004 || Kitt Peak || Spacewatch || HYG || align=right | 3.0 km || 
|-id=153 bgcolor=#fefefe
| 385153 ||  || — || July 9, 2005 || Kitt Peak || Spacewatch || MAS || align=right data-sort-value="0.73" | 730 m || 
|-id=154 bgcolor=#fefefe
| 385154 ||  || — || September 17, 2006 || Catalina || CSS || — || align=right data-sort-value="0.69" | 690 m || 
|-id=155 bgcolor=#E9E9E9
| 385155 ||  || — || October 10, 2004 || Kitt Peak || Spacewatch || HEN || align=right | 1.1 km || 
|-id=156 bgcolor=#E9E9E9
| 385156 ||  || — || October 1, 2000 || Socorro || LINEAR || — || align=right | 2.8 km || 
|-id=157 bgcolor=#E9E9E9
| 385157 ||  || — || November 3, 2004 || Kitt Peak || Spacewatch || GEF || align=right | 1.7 km || 
|-id=158 bgcolor=#E9E9E9
| 385158 ||  || — || March 13, 2007 || Mount Lemmon || Mount Lemmon Survey || WIT || align=right | 1.4 km || 
|-id=159 bgcolor=#d6d6d6
| 385159 ||  || — || April 10, 2005 || Mount Lemmon || Mount Lemmon Survey || URS || align=right | 4.2 km || 
|-id=160 bgcolor=#E9E9E9
| 385160 ||  || — || December 27, 2005 || Mount Lemmon || Mount Lemmon Survey || — || align=right | 2.1 km || 
|-id=161 bgcolor=#E9E9E9
| 385161 ||  || — || September 5, 2008 || Kitt Peak || Spacewatch || DOR || align=right | 3.2 km || 
|-id=162 bgcolor=#fefefe
| 385162 ||  || — || July 27, 2009 || Kitt Peak || Spacewatch || — || align=right | 1.00 km || 
|-id=163 bgcolor=#E9E9E9
| 385163 ||  || — || November 6, 1999 || Catalina || CSS || — || align=right | 3.4 km || 
|-id=164 bgcolor=#E9E9E9
| 385164 ||  || — || April 19, 2007 || Mount Lemmon || Mount Lemmon Survey || WIT || align=right | 1.4 km || 
|-id=165 bgcolor=#E9E9E9
| 385165 ||  || — || November 21, 2009 || Catalina || CSS || — || align=right | 1.4 km || 
|-id=166 bgcolor=#fefefe
| 385166 ||  || — || June 17, 1998 || Kitt Peak || Spacewatch || NYS || align=right data-sort-value="0.82" | 820 m || 
|-id=167 bgcolor=#fefefe
| 385167 ||  || — || November 6, 2005 || Catalina || CSS || H || align=right data-sort-value="0.61" | 610 m || 
|-id=168 bgcolor=#fefefe
| 385168 ||  || — || May 10, 2005 || Kitt Peak || Spacewatch || — || align=right data-sort-value="0.90" | 900 m || 
|-id=169 bgcolor=#fefefe
| 385169 ||  || — || September 18, 2003 || Kitt Peak || Spacewatch || — || align=right data-sort-value="0.63" | 630 m || 
|-id=170 bgcolor=#d6d6d6
| 385170 ||  || — || December 19, 2003 || Socorro || LINEAR || — || align=right | 5.2 km || 
|-id=171 bgcolor=#fefefe
| 385171 ||  || — || December 5, 2002 || Socorro || LINEAR || MAS || align=right data-sort-value="0.79" | 790 m || 
|-id=172 bgcolor=#fefefe
| 385172 ||  || — || December 1, 2003 || Kitt Peak || Spacewatch || FLO || align=right data-sort-value="0.53" | 530 m || 
|-id=173 bgcolor=#E9E9E9
| 385173 ||  || — || October 27, 2005 || Kitt Peak || Spacewatch || — || align=right | 1.0 km || 
|-id=174 bgcolor=#E9E9E9
| 385174 ||  || — || March 14, 2010 || WISE || WISE || — || align=right | 2.7 km || 
|-id=175 bgcolor=#E9E9E9
| 385175 ||  || — || May 7, 2007 || Kitt Peak || Spacewatch || EUN || align=right | 1.5 km || 
|-id=176 bgcolor=#d6d6d6
| 385176 ||  || — || December 2, 2008 || Mount Lemmon || Mount Lemmon Survey || — || align=right | 4.0 km || 
|-id=177 bgcolor=#E9E9E9
| 385177 ||  || — || June 3, 2008 || Kitt Peak || Spacewatch || — || align=right | 1.2 km || 
|-id=178 bgcolor=#d6d6d6
| 385178 ||  || — || September 13, 2007 || Mount Lemmon || Mount Lemmon Survey || — || align=right | 2.7 km || 
|-id=179 bgcolor=#FA8072
| 385179 ||  || — || September 11, 2005 || Kitt Peak || Spacewatch || H || align=right data-sort-value="0.78" | 780 m || 
|-id=180 bgcolor=#E9E9E9
| 385180 ||  || — || December 10, 2004 || Socorro || LINEAR || — || align=right | 3.4 km || 
|-id=181 bgcolor=#E9E9E9
| 385181 ||  || — || August 21, 2000 || Anderson Mesa || LONEOS || — || align=right | 2.0 km || 
|-id=182 bgcolor=#E9E9E9
| 385182 ||  || — || July 30, 2008 || Mount Lemmon || Mount Lemmon Survey || — || align=right | 2.4 km || 
|-id=183 bgcolor=#E9E9E9
| 385183 ||  || — || October 13, 2005 || Kitt Peak || Spacewatch || — || align=right | 1.4 km || 
|-id=184 bgcolor=#fefefe
| 385184 || 4119 T-3 || — || October 16, 1977 || Palomar || PLS || — || align=right | 1.4 km || 
|-id=185 bgcolor=#C2E0FF
| 385185 || 1993 RO || — || September 14, 1993 || Mauna Kea || D. C. Jewitt, J. X. Luu || plutinocritical || align=right | 93 km || 
|-id=186 bgcolor=#FFC2E0
| 385186 ||  || — || January 11, 1994 || Palomar || K. J. Lawrence, E. F. Helin || AMO +1kmPHAmoon || align=right data-sort-value="0.81" | 810 m || 
|-id=187 bgcolor=#E9E9E9
| 385187 ||  || — || September 18, 1995 || Kitt Peak || Spacewatch || — || align=right | 1.1 km || 
|-id=188 bgcolor=#fefefe
| 385188 ||  || — || September 25, 1995 || Kitt Peak || Spacewatch || — || align=right data-sort-value="0.63" | 630 m || 
|-id=189 bgcolor=#fefefe
| 385189 ||  || — || January 16, 1996 || Kitt Peak || Spacewatch || FLO || align=right data-sort-value="0.70" | 700 m || 
|-id=190 bgcolor=#d6d6d6
| 385190 ||  || — || December 4, 1996 || Prescott || P. G. Comba || TIR || align=right | 3.2 km || 
|-id=191 bgcolor=#C2E0FF
| 385191 ||  || — || September 7, 1997 || Palomar || P. Nicholson, B. Gladman, J. A. Burns || cubewano (hot)critical || align=right | 173 km || 
|-id=192 bgcolor=#d6d6d6
| 385192 ||  || — || October 2, 1997 || Kitt Peak || Spacewatch || — || align=right | 2.5 km || 
|-id=193 bgcolor=#d6d6d6
| 385193 ||  || — || January 18, 1998 || Kitt Peak || Spacewatch || — || align=right | 2.0 km || 
|-id=194 bgcolor=#C2E0FF
| 385194 ||  || — || May 29, 1998 || Cerro Tololo || G. Bernstein || cubewano (cold)critical || align=right | 214 km || 
|-id=195 bgcolor=#FA8072
| 385195 ||  || — || March 20, 1999 || Apache Point || SDSS || H || align=right data-sort-value="0.59" | 590 m || 
|-id=196 bgcolor=#d6d6d6
| 385196 ||  || — || March 21, 1999 || Apache Point || SDSS || — || align=right | 1.9 km || 
|-id=197 bgcolor=#d6d6d6
| 385197 ||  || — || May 17, 1999 || Kitt Peak || Spacewatch || EOS || align=right | 2.0 km || 
|-id=198 bgcolor=#E9E9E9
| 385198 ||  || — || July 14, 1999 || Socorro || LINEAR || — || align=right | 2.4 km || 
|-id=199 bgcolor=#C2E0FF
| 385199 ||  || — || July 20, 1999 || Mauna Kea || Mauna Kea Obs. || cubewano (cold)critical || align=right | 238 km || 
|-id=200 bgcolor=#FA8072
| 385200 ||  || — || September 7, 1999 || Socorro || LINEAR || — || align=right | 1.0 km || 
|}

385201–385300 

|-bgcolor=#C2E0FF
| 385201 ||  || — || September 7, 1999 || Mauna Kea || D. C. Jewitt, J. X. Luu, C. Trujillo || cubewano (hot)critical || align=right | 223 km || 
|-id=202 bgcolor=#FA8072
| 385202 ||  || — || September 7, 1999 || Anderson Mesa || LONEOS || — || align=right | 1.7 km || 
|-id=203 bgcolor=#FA8072
| 385203 ||  || — || September 30, 1999 || Catalina || CSS || — || align=right data-sort-value="0.89" | 890 m || 
|-id=204 bgcolor=#fefefe
| 385204 ||  || — || September 30, 1999 || Kitt Peak || Spacewatch || H || align=right data-sort-value="0.70" | 700 m || 
|-id=205 bgcolor=#fefefe
| 385205 Michelvancamp ||  ||  || September 21, 1999 || Uccle || T. Pauwels || — || align=right data-sort-value="0.71" | 710 m || 
|-id=206 bgcolor=#fefefe
| 385206 ||  || — || October 11, 1999 || Prescott || P. G. Comba || — || align=right data-sort-value="0.78" | 780 m || 
|-id=207 bgcolor=#fefefe
| 385207 ||  || — || October 3, 1999 || Kitt Peak || Spacewatch || — || align=right data-sort-value="0.62" | 620 m || 
|-id=208 bgcolor=#E9E9E9
| 385208 ||  || — || October 4, 1999 || Socorro || LINEAR || — || align=right | 2.0 km || 
|-id=209 bgcolor=#fefefe
| 385209 ||  || — || October 6, 1999 || Socorro || LINEAR || — || align=right data-sort-value="0.81" | 810 m || 
|-id=210 bgcolor=#fefefe
| 385210 ||  || — || October 7, 1999 || Socorro || LINEAR || — || align=right data-sort-value="0.69" | 690 m || 
|-id=211 bgcolor=#E9E9E9
| 385211 ||  || — || October 15, 1999 || Socorro || LINEAR || — || align=right | 1.9 km || 
|-id=212 bgcolor=#fefefe
| 385212 ||  || — || October 9, 1999 || Catalina || CSS || H || align=right data-sort-value="0.67" | 670 m || 
|-id=213 bgcolor=#fefefe
| 385213 ||  || — || November 10, 1999 || Kitt Peak || Spacewatch || FLO || align=right data-sort-value="0.79" | 790 m || 
|-id=214 bgcolor=#fefefe
| 385214 ||  || — || November 14, 1999 || Socorro || LINEAR || — || align=right | 1.1 km || 
|-id=215 bgcolor=#fefefe
| 385215 ||  || — || January 2, 2000 || Socorro || LINEAR || PHO || align=right | 1.5 km || 
|-id=216 bgcolor=#fefefe
| 385216 ||  || — || February 26, 2000 || Kitt Peak || Spacewatch || — || align=right data-sort-value="0.63" | 630 m || 
|-id=217 bgcolor=#fefefe
| 385217 ||  || — || February 29, 2000 || Socorro || LINEAR || — || align=right | 1.1 km || 
|-id=218 bgcolor=#fefefe
| 385218 ||  || — || February 29, 2000 || Socorro || LINEAR || NYS || align=right data-sort-value="0.55" | 550 m || 
|-id=219 bgcolor=#E9E9E9
| 385219 ||  || — || February 29, 2000 || Socorro || LINEAR || — || align=right | 2.8 km || 
|-id=220 bgcolor=#fefefe
| 385220 ||  || — || February 29, 2000 || Socorro || LINEAR || — || align=right data-sort-value="0.77" | 770 m || 
|-id=221 bgcolor=#E9E9E9
| 385221 ||  || — || February 25, 2000 || Kitt Peak || Spacewatch || — || align=right | 2.4 km || 
|-id=222 bgcolor=#E9E9E9
| 385222 ||  || — || February 27, 2000 || Kitt Peak || Spacewatch || — || align=right | 2.7 km || 
|-id=223 bgcolor=#fefefe
| 385223 ||  || — || March 3, 2000 || Kitt Peak || Spacewatch || — || align=right data-sort-value="0.55" | 550 m || 
|-id=224 bgcolor=#fefefe
| 385224 ||  || — || March 30, 2000 || Kitt Peak || Spacewatch || NYS || align=right data-sort-value="0.49" | 490 m || 
|-id=225 bgcolor=#fefefe
| 385225 ||  || — || April 5, 2000 || Kitt Peak || Spacewatch || MAS || align=right data-sort-value="0.52" | 520 m || 
|-id=226 bgcolor=#fefefe
| 385226 ||  || — || April 6, 2000 || Anderson Mesa || LONEOS || — || align=right | 2.0 km || 
|-id=227 bgcolor=#d6d6d6
| 385227 ||  || — || May 6, 2000 || Kitt Peak || Spacewatch || — || align=right | 2.4 km || 
|-id=228 bgcolor=#fefefe
| 385228 ||  || — || May 29, 2000 || Prescott || P. G. Comba || MAS || align=right data-sort-value="0.86" | 860 m || 
|-id=229 bgcolor=#d6d6d6
| 385229 ||  || — || August 1, 2000 || Socorro || LINEAR || — || align=right | 4.0 km || 
|-id=230 bgcolor=#d6d6d6
| 385230 ||  || — || August 31, 2000 || Kitt Peak || Spacewatch || — || align=right | 3.1 km || 
|-id=231 bgcolor=#E9E9E9
| 385231 ||  || — || August 31, 2000 || Socorro || LINEAR || — || align=right | 1.2 km || 
|-id=232 bgcolor=#E9E9E9
| 385232 ||  || — || August 31, 2000 || Socorro || LINEAR || — || align=right | 1.1 km || 
|-id=233 bgcolor=#E9E9E9
| 385233 ||  || — || September 20, 2000 || Haleakala || NEAT || — || align=right | 1.6 km || 
|-id=234 bgcolor=#E9E9E9
| 385234 ||  || — || September 25, 2000 || Socorro || LINEAR || — || align=right | 1.1 km || 
|-id=235 bgcolor=#E9E9E9
| 385235 ||  || — || September 26, 2000 || Socorro || LINEAR || — || align=right data-sort-value="0.96" | 960 m || 
|-id=236 bgcolor=#E9E9E9
| 385236 ||  || — || September 24, 2000 || Socorro || LINEAR || RAF || align=right | 1.1 km || 
|-id=237 bgcolor=#E9E9E9
| 385237 ||  || — || September 23, 2000 || Socorro || LINEAR || — || align=right | 1.2 km || 
|-id=238 bgcolor=#E9E9E9
| 385238 ||  || — || September 26, 2000 || Socorro || LINEAR || — || align=right | 1.3 km || 
|-id=239 bgcolor=#E9E9E9
| 385239 ||  || — || September 27, 2000 || Socorro || LINEAR || — || align=right | 1.1 km || 
|-id=240 bgcolor=#FA8072
| 385240 ||  || — || September 20, 2000 || Socorro || LINEAR || — || align=right | 1.1 km || 
|-id=241 bgcolor=#E9E9E9
| 385241 ||  || — || October 25, 2000 || Socorro || LINEAR || — || align=right | 1.2 km || 
|-id=242 bgcolor=#E9E9E9
| 385242 ||  || — || October 31, 2000 || Socorro || LINEAR || — || align=right | 3.4 km || 
|-id=243 bgcolor=#E9E9E9
| 385243 ||  || — || November 2, 2000 || Socorro || LINEAR || ADE || align=right | 2.9 km || 
|-id=244 bgcolor=#E9E9E9
| 385244 ||  || — || November 16, 2000 || Socorro || LINEAR || — || align=right | 2.1 km || 
|-id=245 bgcolor=#FA8072
| 385245 ||  || — || November 16, 2000 || Socorro || LINEAR || — || align=right | 2.0 km || 
|-id=246 bgcolor=#E9E9E9
| 385246 ||  || — || November 19, 2000 || Socorro || LINEAR || BAR || align=right | 1.5 km || 
|-id=247 bgcolor=#FA8072
| 385247 ||  || — || December 26, 2000 || Haleakala || NEAT || — || align=right | 1.6 km || 
|-id=248 bgcolor=#E9E9E9
| 385248 ||  || — || January 4, 2001 || Kitt Peak || Spacewatch || — || align=right | 1.7 km || 
|-id=249 bgcolor=#fefefe
| 385249 ||  || — || February 15, 2001 || Socorro || LINEAR || — || align=right | 1.0 km || 
|-id=250 bgcolor=#FA8072
| 385250 ||  || — || February 20, 2001 || Socorro || LINEAR || — || align=right data-sort-value="0.50" | 500 m || 
|-id=251 bgcolor=#fefefe
| 385251 ||  || — || February 22, 2001 || Kitt Peak || Spacewatch || FLO || align=right data-sort-value="0.61" | 610 m || 
|-id=252 bgcolor=#FFC2E0
| 385252 ||  || — || March 1, 2001 || Socorro || LINEAR || APOPHAcritical || align=right data-sort-value="0.47" | 470 m || 
|-id=253 bgcolor=#E9E9E9
| 385253 ||  || — || March 29, 2001 || Anderson Mesa || LONEOS || — || align=right | 2.1 km || 
|-id=254 bgcolor=#E9E9E9
| 385254 ||  || — || March 16, 2001 || Socorro || LINEAR || JUN || align=right | 3.4 km || 
|-id=255 bgcolor=#fefefe
| 385255 ||  || — || May 22, 2001 || Cerro Tololo || Cerro Tololo Obs. || — || align=right data-sort-value="0.79" | 790 m || 
|-id=256 bgcolor=#fefefe
| 385256 ||  || — || July 18, 2001 || Palomar || NEAT || H || align=right data-sort-value="0.91" | 910 m || 
|-id=257 bgcolor=#d6d6d6
| 385257 ||  || — || July 19, 2001 || Palomar || NEAT || — || align=right | 3.8 km || 
|-id=258 bgcolor=#d6d6d6
| 385258 ||  || — || July 22, 2001 || Palomar || NEAT || — || align=right | 3.6 km || 
|-id=259 bgcolor=#fefefe
| 385259 ||  || — || August 12, 2001 || Ondřejov || P. Kušnirák || NYS || align=right data-sort-value="0.67" | 670 m || 
|-id=260 bgcolor=#d6d6d6
| 385260 ||  || — || August 25, 2001 || Socorro || LINEAR || — || align=right | 3.5 km || 
|-id=261 bgcolor=#fefefe
| 385261 ||  || — || August 23, 2001 || Anderson Mesa || LONEOS || — || align=right | 1.0 km || 
|-id=262 bgcolor=#fefefe
| 385262 ||  || — || August 23, 2001 || Anderson Mesa || LONEOS || H || align=right data-sort-value="0.81" | 810 m || 
|-id=263 bgcolor=#d6d6d6
| 385263 ||  || — || August 22, 2001 || Socorro || LINEAR || TIR || align=right | 4.2 km || 
|-id=264 bgcolor=#fefefe
| 385264 ||  || — || August 23, 2001 || Anderson Mesa || LONEOS || — || align=right | 1.0 km || 
|-id=265 bgcolor=#d6d6d6
| 385265 ||  || — || August 23, 2001 || Anderson Mesa || LONEOS || — || align=right | 2.8 km || 
|-id=266 bgcolor=#C2E0FF
| 385266 ||  || — || August 20, 2001 || Cerro Tololo || M. W. Buie || cubewano (cold)critical || align=right | 193 km || 
|-id=267 bgcolor=#d6d6d6
| 385267 ||  || — || August 27, 2001 || Anderson Mesa || LONEOS || — || align=right | 3.0 km || 
|-id=268 bgcolor=#FFC2E0
| 385268 ||  || — || September 10, 2001 || Socorro || LINEAR || AMO +1km || align=right | 3.2 km || 
|-id=269 bgcolor=#fefefe
| 385269 ||  || — || September 9, 2001 || Socorro || LINEAR || NYS || align=right data-sort-value="0.70" | 700 m || 
|-id=270 bgcolor=#fefefe
| 385270 ||  || — || September 12, 2001 || Socorro || LINEAR || MAS || align=right data-sort-value="0.98" | 980 m || 
|-id=271 bgcolor=#fefefe
| 385271 ||  || — || September 12, 2001 || Socorro || LINEAR || — || align=right data-sort-value="0.87" | 870 m || 
|-id=272 bgcolor=#d6d6d6
| 385272 ||  || — || September 12, 2001 || Socorro || LINEAR || — || align=right | 2.6 km || 
|-id=273 bgcolor=#fefefe
| 385273 ||  || — || September 20, 2001 || Socorro || LINEAR || — || align=right data-sort-value="0.98" | 980 m || 
|-id=274 bgcolor=#fefefe
| 385274 ||  || — || September 16, 2001 || Socorro || LINEAR || — || align=right data-sort-value="0.94" | 940 m || 
|-id=275 bgcolor=#fefefe
| 385275 ||  || — || September 16, 2001 || Socorro || LINEAR || NYS || align=right data-sort-value="0.70" | 700 m || 
|-id=276 bgcolor=#fefefe
| 385276 ||  || — || September 19, 2001 || Socorro || LINEAR || MAS || align=right data-sort-value="0.76" | 760 m || 
|-id=277 bgcolor=#d6d6d6
| 385277 ||  || — || September 19, 2001 || Socorro || LINEAR || — || align=right | 3.7 km || 
|-id=278 bgcolor=#fefefe
| 385278 ||  || — || September 19, 2001 || Socorro || LINEAR || PHO || align=right | 1.5 km || 
|-id=279 bgcolor=#d6d6d6
| 385279 ||  || — || September 19, 2001 || Socorro || LINEAR || EOS || align=right | 2.3 km || 
|-id=280 bgcolor=#fefefe
| 385280 ||  || — || September 19, 2001 || Socorro || LINEAR || MAS || align=right data-sort-value="0.73" | 730 m || 
|-id=281 bgcolor=#fefefe
| 385281 ||  || — || September 19, 2001 || Socorro || LINEAR || NYS || align=right data-sort-value="0.90" | 900 m || 
|-id=282 bgcolor=#d6d6d6
| 385282 ||  || — || September 19, 2001 || Socorro || LINEAR || — || align=right | 3.4 km || 
|-id=283 bgcolor=#fefefe
| 385283 ||  || — || September 24, 2001 || Socorro || LINEAR || PHO || align=right | 1.5 km || 
|-id=284 bgcolor=#fefefe
| 385284 ||  || — || September 20, 2001 || Kitt Peak || Spacewatch || MAS || align=right data-sort-value="0.63" | 630 m || 
|-id=285 bgcolor=#d6d6d6
| 385285 ||  || — || September 23, 2001 || Kitt Peak || Spacewatch || — || align=right | 3.4 km || 
|-id=286 bgcolor=#d6d6d6
| 385286 ||  || — || September 20, 2001 || Anderson Mesa || LONEOS || — || align=right | 3.8 km || 
|-id=287 bgcolor=#d6d6d6
| 385287 ||  || — || October 14, 2001 || Socorro || LINEAR || EUP || align=right | 3.6 km || 
|-id=288 bgcolor=#d6d6d6
| 385288 ||  || — || October 14, 2001 || Socorro || LINEAR || — || align=right | 3.7 km || 
|-id=289 bgcolor=#d6d6d6
| 385289 ||  || — || September 19, 2001 || Kitt Peak || Spacewatch || — || align=right | 3.2 km || 
|-id=290 bgcolor=#E9E9E9
| 385290 ||  || — || October 14, 2001 || Palomar || NEAT || — || align=right data-sort-value="0.95" | 950 m || 
|-id=291 bgcolor=#d6d6d6
| 385291 ||  || — || October 11, 2001 || Palomar || NEAT || — || align=right | 3.1 km || 
|-id=292 bgcolor=#fefefe
| 385292 ||  || — || October 13, 2001 || Palomar || NEAT || — || align=right data-sort-value="0.88" | 880 m || 
|-id=293 bgcolor=#d6d6d6
| 385293 ||  || — || August 26, 2001 || Anderson Mesa || LONEOS || — || align=right | 3.5 km || 
|-id=294 bgcolor=#d6d6d6
| 385294 ||  || — || October 17, 2001 || Socorro || LINEAR || THB || align=right | 3.1 km || 
|-id=295 bgcolor=#d6d6d6
| 385295 ||  || — || October 18, 2001 || Kitt Peak || Spacewatch || — || align=right | 2.8 km || 
|-id=296 bgcolor=#fefefe
| 385296 ||  || — || October 20, 2001 || Socorro || LINEAR || MAS || align=right data-sort-value="0.94" | 940 m || 
|-id=297 bgcolor=#fefefe
| 385297 ||  || — || October 23, 2001 || Socorro || LINEAR || — || align=right data-sort-value="0.81" | 810 m || 
|-id=298 bgcolor=#fefefe
| 385298 ||  || — || October 18, 2001 || Palomar || NEAT || MAS || align=right data-sort-value="0.72" | 720 m || 
|-id=299 bgcolor=#fefefe
| 385299 ||  || — || October 25, 2001 || Palomar || NEAT || NYS || align=right data-sort-value="0.57" | 570 m || 
|-id=300 bgcolor=#d6d6d6
| 385300 ||  || — || October 21, 2001 || Socorro || LINEAR || — || align=right | 3.8 km || 
|}

385301–385400 

|-bgcolor=#d6d6d6
| 385301 ||  || — || October 16, 2001 || Palomar || NEAT || HYG || align=right | 2.4 km || 
|-id=302 bgcolor=#fefefe
| 385302 ||  || — || October 16, 2001 || Palomar || NEAT || — || align=right data-sort-value="0.81" | 810 m || 
|-id=303 bgcolor=#fefefe
| 385303 ||  || — || November 10, 2001 || Socorro || LINEAR || — || align=right data-sort-value="0.85" | 850 m || 
|-id=304 bgcolor=#d6d6d6
| 385304 ||  || — || November 12, 2001 || Socorro || LINEAR || ALA || align=right | 3.9 km || 
|-id=305 bgcolor=#d6d6d6
| 385305 ||  || — || October 24, 2001 || Socorro || LINEAR || — || align=right | 2.4 km || 
|-id=306 bgcolor=#d6d6d6
| 385306 ||  || — || November 12, 2001 || Socorro || LINEAR || — || align=right | 3.8 km || 
|-id=307 bgcolor=#fefefe
| 385307 ||  || — || November 12, 2001 || Socorro || LINEAR || NYS || align=right data-sort-value="0.72" | 720 m || 
|-id=308 bgcolor=#d6d6d6
| 385308 ||  || — || November 11, 2001 || Apache Point || SDSS || — || align=right | 2.7 km || 
|-id=309 bgcolor=#d6d6d6
| 385309 ||  || — || November 17, 2001 || Socorro || LINEAR || — || align=right | 3.3 km || 
|-id=310 bgcolor=#E9E9E9
| 385310 ||  || — || December 14, 2001 || Socorro || LINEAR || HNS || align=right | 1.4 km || 
|-id=311 bgcolor=#fefefe
| 385311 ||  || — || December 15, 2001 || Socorro || LINEAR || 417 || align=right data-sort-value="0.99" | 990 m || 
|-id=312 bgcolor=#fefefe
| 385312 ||  || — || December 15, 2001 || Socorro || LINEAR || — || align=right data-sort-value="0.81" | 810 m || 
|-id=313 bgcolor=#fefefe
| 385313 ||  || — || December 15, 2001 || Socorro || LINEAR || NYS || align=right data-sort-value="0.72" | 720 m || 
|-id=314 bgcolor=#fefefe
| 385314 ||  || — || December 18, 2001 || Socorro || LINEAR || — || align=right | 1.0 km || 
|-id=315 bgcolor=#fefefe
| 385315 ||  || — || December 18, 2001 || Socorro || LINEAR || — || align=right | 1.1 km || 
|-id=316 bgcolor=#fefefe
| 385316 ||  || — || December 18, 2001 || Socorro || LINEAR || — || align=right | 1.2 km || 
|-id=317 bgcolor=#fefefe
| 385317 ||  || — || December 18, 2001 || Socorro || LINEAR || — || align=right data-sort-value="0.94" | 940 m || 
|-id=318 bgcolor=#E9E9E9
| 385318 ||  || — || December 18, 2001 || Kitt Peak || Spacewatch || — || align=right data-sort-value="0.82" | 820 m || 
|-id=319 bgcolor=#d6d6d6
| 385319 ||  || — || December 19, 2001 || Palomar || NEAT || ALA || align=right | 3.5 km || 
|-id=320 bgcolor=#E9E9E9
| 385320 ||  || — || January 12, 2002 || Socorro || LINEAR || — || align=right | 1.1 km || 
|-id=321 bgcolor=#E9E9E9
| 385321 ||  || — || December 14, 2001 || Kitt Peak || Spacewatch || — || align=right | 2.4 km || 
|-id=322 bgcolor=#E9E9E9
| 385322 ||  || — || January 14, 2002 || Socorro || LINEAR || — || align=right data-sort-value="0.98" | 980 m || 
|-id=323 bgcolor=#E9E9E9
| 385323 ||  || — || February 6, 2002 || Socorro || LINEAR || — || align=right | 1.6 km || 
|-id=324 bgcolor=#E9E9E9
| 385324 ||  || — || February 4, 2002 || Palomar || NEAT || — || align=right | 1.3 km || 
|-id=325 bgcolor=#FA8072
| 385325 ||  || — || February 8, 2002 || Socorro || LINEAR || — || align=right data-sort-value="0.30" | 300 m || 
|-id=326 bgcolor=#E9E9E9
| 385326 ||  || — || February 7, 2002 || Palomar || NEAT || — || align=right | 3.5 km || 
|-id=327 bgcolor=#E9E9E9
| 385327 ||  || — || February 9, 2002 || Kitt Peak || Spacewatch || — || align=right | 2.2 km || 
|-id=328 bgcolor=#E9E9E9
| 385328 ||  || — || February 10, 2002 || Socorro || LINEAR || MAR || align=right | 1.1 km || 
|-id=329 bgcolor=#E9E9E9
| 385329 ||  || — || February 13, 2002 || Kitt Peak || Spacewatch || — || align=right | 1.4 km || 
|-id=330 bgcolor=#C2FFFF
| 385330 ||  || — || February 7, 2002 || Kitt Peak || M. W. Buie || L4 || align=right | 13 km || 
|-id=331 bgcolor=#E9E9E9
| 385331 ||  || — || February 7, 2002 || Palomar || NEAT || RAF || align=right | 1.1 km || 
|-id=332 bgcolor=#E9E9E9
| 385332 ||  || — || March 19, 2002 || Palomar || NEAT || — || align=right | 2.1 km || 
|-id=333 bgcolor=#E9E9E9
| 385333 ||  || — || April 13, 2002 || Palomar || NEAT || — || align=right | 1.8 km || 
|-id=334 bgcolor=#E9E9E9
| 385334 ||  || — || April 11, 2002 || Anderson Mesa || LONEOS || JUN || align=right | 1.4 km || 
|-id=335 bgcolor=#E9E9E9
| 385335 ||  || — || April 12, 2002 || Socorro || LINEAR || — || align=right data-sort-value="0.93" | 930 m || 
|-id=336 bgcolor=#E9E9E9
| 385336 ||  || — || April 12, 2002 || Socorro || LINEAR || JUN || align=right | 1.1 km || 
|-id=337 bgcolor=#E9E9E9
| 385337 ||  || — || April 5, 2002 || Palomar || NEAT || MAR || align=right | 1.0 km || 
|-id=338 bgcolor=#E9E9E9
| 385338 ||  || — || May 6, 2002 || Socorro || LINEAR || — || align=right | 1.3 km || 
|-id=339 bgcolor=#E9E9E9
| 385339 ||  || — || May 9, 2002 || Socorro || LINEAR || — || align=right | 1.3 km || 
|-id=340 bgcolor=#C2FFFF
| 385340 ||  || — || May 11, 2002 || La Palma || La Palma Obs. || L4 || align=right | 13 km || 
|-id=341 bgcolor=#E9E9E9
| 385341 ||  || — || May 5, 2002 || Palomar || NEAT || — || align=right | 1.9 km || 
|-id=342 bgcolor=#FA8072
| 385342 ||  || — || June 1, 2002 || Socorro || LINEAR || — || align=right | 1.7 km || 
|-id=343 bgcolor=#FFC2E0
| 385343 ||  || — || June 1, 2002 || Socorro || LINEAR || APO +1kmPHA || align=right | 1.4 km || 
|-id=344 bgcolor=#E9E9E9
| 385344 ||  || — || July 9, 2002 || Palomar || NEAT || — || align=right | 1.9 km || 
|-id=345 bgcolor=#E9E9E9
| 385345 ||  || — || July 8, 2002 || Palomar || NEAT || IAN || align=right | 1.4 km || 
|-id=346 bgcolor=#fefefe
| 385346 ||  || — || July 19, 2002 || Palomar || NEAT || FLO || align=right data-sort-value="0.59" | 590 m || 
|-id=347 bgcolor=#d6d6d6
| 385347 ||  || — || July 29, 2002 || Palomar || NEAT || — || align=right | 2.7 km || 
|-id=348 bgcolor=#E9E9E9
| 385348 ||  || — || July 18, 2002 || Palomar || NEAT || — || align=right | 1.6 km || 
|-id=349 bgcolor=#fefefe
| 385349 ||  || — || July 22, 2002 || Palomar || NEAT || FLO || align=right data-sort-value="0.52" | 520 m || 
|-id=350 bgcolor=#fefefe
| 385350 ||  || — || August 5, 2002 || Palomar || NEAT || — || align=right data-sort-value="0.84" | 840 m || 
|-id=351 bgcolor=#fefefe
| 385351 ||  || — || August 6, 2002 || Palomar || NEAT || — || align=right | 1.6 km || 
|-id=352 bgcolor=#E9E9E9
| 385352 ||  || — || August 6, 2002 || Palomar || NEAT || — || align=right | 1.7 km || 
|-id=353 bgcolor=#fefefe
| 385353 ||  || — || August 10, 2002 || Socorro || LINEAR || H || align=right data-sort-value="0.93" | 930 m || 
|-id=354 bgcolor=#FA8072
| 385354 ||  || — || August 10, 2002 || Socorro || LINEAR || — || align=right | 1.4 km || 
|-id=355 bgcolor=#FA8072
| 385355 ||  || — || August 14, 2002 || Socorro || LINEAR || — || align=right | 1.1 km || 
|-id=356 bgcolor=#E9E9E9
| 385356 ||  || — || August 14, 2002 || Socorro || LINEAR || — || align=right | 3.3 km || 
|-id=357 bgcolor=#E9E9E9
| 385357 ||  || — || August 15, 2002 || Anderson Mesa || LONEOS || — || align=right | 3.2 km || 
|-id=358 bgcolor=#FA8072
| 385358 ||  || — || August 8, 2002 || Palomar || NEAT || H || align=right data-sort-value="0.68" | 680 m || 
|-id=359 bgcolor=#fefefe
| 385359 ||  || — || August 14, 2002 || Socorro || LINEAR || H || align=right data-sort-value="0.86" | 860 m || 
|-id=360 bgcolor=#fefefe
| 385360 ||  || — || August 12, 2002 || Cerro Tololo || M. W. Buie || — || align=right data-sort-value="0.83" | 830 m || 
|-id=361 bgcolor=#fefefe
| 385361 ||  || — || August 8, 2002 || Palomar || NEAT || — || align=right data-sort-value="0.68" | 680 m || 
|-id=362 bgcolor=#C2E0FF
| 385362 ||  || — || August 5, 2002 || Mauna Kea || Mauna Kea Obs. || cubewano (cold)critical || align=right | 233 km || 
|-id=363 bgcolor=#C2E0FF
| 385363 ||  || — || August 5, 2002 || Mauna Kea || Mauna Kea Obs. || cubewano (cold)critical || align=right | 255 km || 
|-id=364 bgcolor=#fefefe
| 385364 ||  || — || August 8, 2002 || Palomar || NEAT || — || align=right data-sort-value="0.67" | 670 m || 
|-id=365 bgcolor=#E9E9E9
| 385365 ||  || — || August 15, 2002 || Palomar || NEAT || JUN || align=right | 1.4 km || 
|-id=366 bgcolor=#E9E9E9
| 385366 ||  || — || August 11, 2002 || Palomar || NEAT || WIT || align=right | 1.2 km || 
|-id=367 bgcolor=#fefefe
| 385367 ||  || — || August 7, 2002 || Palomar || NEAT || — || align=right data-sort-value="0.82" | 820 m || 
|-id=368 bgcolor=#FA8072
| 385368 ||  || — || August 12, 2002 || Socorro || LINEAR || — || align=right | 1.8 km || 
|-id=369 bgcolor=#fefefe
| 385369 ||  || — || August 8, 2002 || Palomar || NEAT || FLO || align=right data-sort-value="0.56" | 560 m || 
|-id=370 bgcolor=#E9E9E9
| 385370 ||  || — || August 26, 2002 || Palomar || NEAT || EUN || align=right | 1.4 km || 
|-id=371 bgcolor=#FA8072
| 385371 ||  || — || August 27, 2002 || Palomar || NEAT || — || align=right data-sort-value="0.75" | 750 m || 
|-id=372 bgcolor=#fefefe
| 385372 ||  || — || August 26, 2002 || Palomar || NEAT || V || align=right data-sort-value="0.82" | 820 m || 
|-id=373 bgcolor=#fefefe
| 385373 ||  || — || August 17, 2002 || Palomar || NEAT || — || align=right data-sort-value="0.64" | 640 m || 
|-id=374 bgcolor=#E9E9E9
| 385374 ||  || — || August 30, 2002 || Palomar || NEAT || — || align=right | 3.2 km || 
|-id=375 bgcolor=#E9E9E9
| 385375 ||  || — || August 17, 2002 || Palomar || NEAT || — || align=right | 2.2 km || 
|-id=376 bgcolor=#fefefe
| 385376 ||  || — || September 3, 2002 || Haleakala || NEAT || — || align=right data-sort-value="0.86" | 860 m || 
|-id=377 bgcolor=#FA8072
| 385377 ||  || — || September 3, 2002 || Haleakala || NEAT || PHO || align=right | 1.00 km || 
|-id=378 bgcolor=#d6d6d6
| 385378 ||  || — || September 4, 2002 || Anderson Mesa || LONEOS || BRA || align=right | 1.8 km || 
|-id=379 bgcolor=#fefefe
| 385379 ||  || — || September 5, 2002 || Anderson Mesa || LONEOS || FLO || align=right data-sort-value="0.77" | 770 m || 
|-id=380 bgcolor=#fefefe
| 385380 ||  || — || September 5, 2002 || Socorro || LINEAR || H || align=right data-sort-value="0.67" | 670 m || 
|-id=381 bgcolor=#FA8072
| 385381 ||  || — || September 5, 2002 || Socorro || LINEAR || PHO || align=right | 1.2 km || 
|-id=382 bgcolor=#E9E9E9
| 385382 ||  || — || September 15, 2002 || Palomar || R. Matson || — || align=right | 2.3 km || 
|-id=383 bgcolor=#E9E9E9
| 385383 ||  || — || September 8, 2002 || Haleakala || NEAT || — || align=right | 2.6 km || 
|-id=384 bgcolor=#FA8072
| 385384 ||  || — || September 27, 2002 || Palomar || NEAT || H || align=right data-sort-value="0.53" | 530 m || 
|-id=385 bgcolor=#FA8072
| 385385 ||  || — || September 16, 2002 || Palomar || NEAT || H || align=right data-sort-value="0.72" | 720 m || 
|-id=386 bgcolor=#fefefe
| 385386 ||  || — || October 1, 2002 || Anderson Mesa || LONEOS || — || align=right | 1.7 km || 
|-id=387 bgcolor=#fefefe
| 385387 ||  || — || October 3, 2002 || Socorro || LINEAR || H || align=right data-sort-value="0.86" | 860 m || 
|-id=388 bgcolor=#fefefe
| 385388 ||  || — || October 3, 2002 || Socorro || LINEAR || — || align=right data-sort-value="0.91" | 910 m || 
|-id=389 bgcolor=#d6d6d6
| 385389 ||  || — || October 10, 2002 || Socorro || LINEAR || IMH || align=right | 3.4 km || 
|-id=390 bgcolor=#d6d6d6
| 385390 ||  || — || October 5, 2002 || Apache Point || SDSS || — || align=right | 2.2 km || 
|-id=391 bgcolor=#d6d6d6
| 385391 ||  || — || October 15, 2002 || Palomar || NEAT || — || align=right | 3.3 km || 
|-id=392 bgcolor=#fefefe
| 385392 ||  || — || October 29, 2002 || Apache Point || SDSS || — || align=right data-sort-value="0.71" | 710 m || 
|-id=393 bgcolor=#d6d6d6
| 385393 ||  || — || November 1, 2002 || La Palma || La Palma Obs. || — || align=right | 2.6 km || 
|-id=394 bgcolor=#fefefe
| 385394 ||  || — || November 1, 2002 || Palomar || NEAT || FLO || align=right | 1.3 km || 
|-id=395 bgcolor=#FA8072
| 385395 ||  || — || November 6, 2002 || Socorro || LINEAR || — || align=right | 1.1 km || 
|-id=396 bgcolor=#fefefe
| 385396 ||  || — || November 5, 2002 || Socorro || LINEAR || NYS || align=right data-sort-value="0.73" | 730 m || 
|-id=397 bgcolor=#fefefe
| 385397 ||  || — || November 5, 2002 || Socorro || LINEAR || ERI || align=right | 2.0 km || 
|-id=398 bgcolor=#fefefe
| 385398 ||  || — || November 5, 2002 || Socorro || LINEAR || — || align=right data-sort-value="0.85" | 850 m || 
|-id=399 bgcolor=#fefefe
| 385399 ||  || — || November 6, 2002 || Socorro || LINEAR || — || align=right data-sort-value="0.83" | 830 m || 
|-id=400 bgcolor=#fefefe
| 385400 ||  || — || November 14, 2002 || Socorro || LINEAR || — || align=right data-sort-value="0.96" | 960 m || 
|}

385401–385500 

|-bgcolor=#fefefe
| 385401 ||  || — || November 14, 2002 || Socorro || LINEAR || V || align=right data-sort-value="0.89" | 890 m || 
|-id=402 bgcolor=#FFC2E0
| 385402 ||  || — || November 23, 2002 || Palomar || NEAT || APO +1kmcritical || align=right | 1.6 km || 
|-id=403 bgcolor=#fefefe
| 385403 ||  || — || November 24, 2002 || Palomar || NEAT || NYS || align=right data-sort-value="0.67" | 670 m || 
|-id=404 bgcolor=#fefefe
| 385404 ||  || — || November 24, 2002 || Palomar || NEAT || — || align=right data-sort-value="0.75" | 750 m || 
|-id=405 bgcolor=#fefefe
| 385405 ||  || — || December 2, 2002 || Socorro || LINEAR || — || align=right | 1.7 km || 
|-id=406 bgcolor=#fefefe
| 385406 ||  || — || December 6, 2002 || Socorro || LINEAR || — || align=right | 1.1 km || 
|-id=407 bgcolor=#fefefe
| 385407 ||  || — || December 10, 2002 || Palomar || NEAT || — || align=right | 1.7 km || 
|-id=408 bgcolor=#FA8072
| 385408 ||  || — || December 11, 2002 || Socorro || LINEAR || PHO || align=right | 1.3 km || 
|-id=409 bgcolor=#fefefe
| 385409 ||  || — || December 10, 2002 || Socorro || LINEAR || ERI || align=right | 1.4 km || 
|-id=410 bgcolor=#d6d6d6
| 385410 ||  || — || December 10, 2002 || Palomar || NEAT || EOS || align=right | 2.0 km || 
|-id=411 bgcolor=#fefefe
| 385411 ||  || — || December 31, 2002 || Socorro || LINEAR || — || align=right data-sort-value="0.94" | 940 m || 
|-id=412 bgcolor=#d6d6d6
| 385412 ||  || — || January 5, 2003 || Socorro || LINEAR || — || align=right | 4.7 km || 
|-id=413 bgcolor=#fefefe
| 385413 ||  || — || January 10, 2003 || Socorro || LINEAR || H || align=right data-sort-value="0.66" | 660 m || 
|-id=414 bgcolor=#d6d6d6
| 385414 ||  || — || January 11, 2003 || Socorro || LINEAR || — || align=right | 3.0 km || 
|-id=415 bgcolor=#fefefe
| 385415 ||  || — || January 11, 2003 || Kitt Peak || Spacewatch || — || align=right data-sort-value="0.85" | 850 m || 
|-id=416 bgcolor=#d6d6d6
| 385416 ||  || — || January 8, 2003 || Socorro || LINEAR || — || align=right | 3.9 km || 
|-id=417 bgcolor=#d6d6d6
| 385417 ||  || — || January 29, 2003 || Palomar || NEAT || EUP || align=right | 4.5 km || 
|-id=418 bgcolor=#d6d6d6
| 385418 ||  || — || January 28, 2003 || Palomar || NEAT || — || align=right | 3.4 km || 
|-id=419 bgcolor=#fefefe
| 385419 ||  || — || January 30, 2003 || Anderson Mesa || LONEOS || H || align=right data-sort-value="0.72" | 720 m || 
|-id=420 bgcolor=#d6d6d6
| 385420 ||  || — || February 2, 2003 || Socorro || LINEAR || — || align=right | 5.2 km || 
|-id=421 bgcolor=#d6d6d6
| 385421 ||  || — || February 11, 2003 || Haleakala || NEAT || TIR || align=right | 2.9 km || 
|-id=422 bgcolor=#d6d6d6
| 385422 ||  || — || February 21, 2003 || Palomar || NEAT || EUP || align=right | 3.7 km || 
|-id=423 bgcolor=#FFC2E0
| 385423 ||  || — || February 23, 2003 || Palomar || NEAT || AMO || align=right data-sort-value="0.53" | 530 m || 
|-id=424 bgcolor=#d6d6d6
| 385424 ||  || — || February 23, 2003 || Črni Vrh || H. Mikuž || LIX || align=right | 4.1 km || 
|-id=425 bgcolor=#d6d6d6
| 385425 ||  || — || February 23, 2003 || Socorro || LINEAR || Tj (2.87) || align=right | 5.6 km || 
|-id=426 bgcolor=#d6d6d6
| 385426 ||  || — || January 31, 2003 || Socorro || LINEAR || — || align=right | 4.4 km || 
|-id=427 bgcolor=#d6d6d6
| 385427 ||  || — || March 8, 2003 || Socorro || LINEAR || TIR || align=right | 3.3 km || 
|-id=428 bgcolor=#fefefe
| 385428 ||  || — || March 9, 2003 || Anderson Mesa || LONEOS || MAS || align=right data-sort-value="0.82" | 820 m || 
|-id=429 bgcolor=#fefefe
| 385429 ||  || — || March 10, 2003 || Anderson Mesa || LONEOS || — || align=right | 1.1 km || 
|-id=430 bgcolor=#fefefe
| 385430 ||  || — || March 11, 2003 || Kitt Peak || Spacewatch || NYS || align=right data-sort-value="0.60" | 600 m || 
|-id=431 bgcolor=#d6d6d6
| 385431 ||  || — || March 25, 2003 || Haleakala || NEAT || — || align=right | 3.2 km || 
|-id=432 bgcolor=#d6d6d6
| 385432 ||  || — || March 7, 2003 || Anderson Mesa || LONEOS || MEL || align=right | 4.0 km || 
|-id=433 bgcolor=#fefefe
| 385433 ||  || — || March 26, 2003 || Palomar || NEAT || — || align=right | 1.1 km || 
|-id=434 bgcolor=#fefefe
| 385434 ||  || — || March 26, 2003 || Palomar || NEAT || — || align=right | 1.2 km || 
|-id=435 bgcolor=#fefefe
| 385435 ||  || — || March 22, 2003 || Palomar || NEAT || — || align=right data-sort-value="0.94" | 940 m || 
|-id=436 bgcolor=#fefefe
| 385436 ||  || — || March 27, 2003 || Kitt Peak || Spacewatch || MAS || align=right data-sort-value="0.73" | 730 m || 
|-id=437 bgcolor=#C2E0FF
| 385437 ||  || — || April 1, 2003 || Cerro Tololo || DLS || cubewano (cold)critical || align=right | 281 km || 
|-id=438 bgcolor=#fefefe
| 385438 ||  || — || April 24, 2003 || Anderson Mesa || LONEOS || NYS || align=right data-sort-value="0.73" | 730 m || 
|-id=439 bgcolor=#d6d6d6
| 385439 ||  || — || April 25, 2003 || Kitt Peak || Spacewatch || THM || align=right | 2.3 km || 
|-id=440 bgcolor=#E9E9E9
| 385440 ||  || — || June 26, 2003 || Socorro || LINEAR || — || align=right | 1.3 km || 
|-id=441 bgcolor=#E9E9E9
| 385441 ||  || — || July 22, 2003 || Haleakala || NEAT || — || align=right | 2.2 km || 
|-id=442 bgcolor=#E9E9E9
| 385442 ||  || — || July 22, 2003 || Campo Imperatore || CINEOS || JUN || align=right | 1.3 km || 
|-id=443 bgcolor=#E9E9E9
| 385443 ||  || — || August 21, 2003 || Palomar || NEAT || — || align=right | 3.1 km || 
|-id=444 bgcolor=#E9E9E9
| 385444 ||  || — || August 22, 2003 || Haleakala || NEAT || — || align=right | 2.6 km || 
|-id=445 bgcolor=#C2E0FF
| 385445 ||  || — || August 24, 2003 || Cerro Tololo || M. W. Buie || plutinocritical || align=right | 193 km || 
|-id=446 bgcolor=#C2E0FF
| 385446 Manwë ||  ||  || August 25, 2003 || Cerro Tololo || M. W. Buie || res4:7mooncritical || align=right | 218 km || 
|-id=447 bgcolor=#C2E0FF
| 385447 ||  || — || August 25, 2003 || Cerro Tololo || M. W. Buie || cubewano (cold)critical || align=right | 212 km || 
|-id=448 bgcolor=#E9E9E9
| 385448 ||  || — || August 23, 2003 || Socorro || LINEAR || — || align=right | 2.5 km || 
|-id=449 bgcolor=#E9E9E9
| 385449 ||  || — || September 17, 2003 || Kitt Peak || Spacewatch || — || align=right | 1.7 km || 
|-id=450 bgcolor=#E9E9E9
| 385450 ||  || — || September 17, 2003 || Haleakala || NEAT || — || align=right | 2.2 km || 
|-id=451 bgcolor=#E9E9E9
| 385451 ||  || — || September 19, 2003 || Palomar || NEAT || — || align=right | 2.8 km || 
|-id=452 bgcolor=#E9E9E9
| 385452 ||  || — || September 17, 2003 || Campo Imperatore || CINEOS || — || align=right | 2.1 km || 
|-id=453 bgcolor=#E9E9E9
| 385453 ||  || — || September 18, 2003 || Socorro || LINEAR || — || align=right | 3.0 km || 
|-id=454 bgcolor=#E9E9E9
| 385454 ||  || — || September 23, 2003 || Haleakala || NEAT || — || align=right | 2.9 km || 
|-id=455 bgcolor=#E9E9E9
| 385455 ||  || — || September 19, 2003 || Campo Imperatore || CINEOS || — || align=right | 2.5 km || 
|-id=456 bgcolor=#E9E9E9
| 385456 ||  || — || September 30, 2003 || Kitt Peak || Spacewatch || GEF || align=right | 1.3 km || 
|-id=457 bgcolor=#E9E9E9
| 385457 ||  || — || September 20, 2003 || Kitt Peak || Spacewatch || EUN || align=right | 1.4 km || 
|-id=458 bgcolor=#C2E0FF
| 385458 ||  || — || September 25, 2003 || Mauna Kea || Mauna Kea Obs. || cubewano (hot)critical || align=right | 161 km || 
|-id=459 bgcolor=#fefefe
| 385459 ||  || — || September 28, 2003 || Socorro || LINEAR || — || align=right data-sort-value="0.71" | 710 m || 
|-id=460 bgcolor=#d6d6d6
| 385460 ||  || — || September 18, 2003 || Kitt Peak || Spacewatch || — || align=right | 2.2 km || 
|-id=461 bgcolor=#E9E9E9
| 385461 ||  || — || September 26, 2003 || Apache Point || SDSS || JUN || align=right | 1.1 km || 
|-id=462 bgcolor=#E9E9E9
| 385462 ||  || — || October 2, 2003 || Kitt Peak || Spacewatch || WIT || align=right data-sort-value="0.80" | 800 m || 
|-id=463 bgcolor=#E9E9E9
| 385463 ||  || — || October 2, 2003 || Kitt Peak || Spacewatch || — || align=right | 3.1 km || 
|-id=464 bgcolor=#E9E9E9
| 385464 ||  || — || October 14, 2003 || Anderson Mesa || LONEOS || CLO || align=right | 2.3 km || 
|-id=465 bgcolor=#E9E9E9
| 385465 ||  || — || October 1, 2003 || Kitt Peak || Spacewatch || — || align=right | 2.4 km || 
|-id=466 bgcolor=#E9E9E9
| 385466 ||  || — || September 22, 2003 || Kitt Peak || Spacewatch || NEM || align=right | 2.4 km || 
|-id=467 bgcolor=#E9E9E9
| 385467 ||  || — || October 16, 2003 || Palomar || NEAT || — || align=right | 2.4 km || 
|-id=468 bgcolor=#E9E9E9
| 385468 ||  || — || October 19, 2003 || Kitt Peak || Spacewatch || NEM || align=right | 2.8 km || 
|-id=469 bgcolor=#d6d6d6
| 385469 ||  || — || October 18, 2003 || Palomar || NEAT || BRA || align=right | 2.2 km || 
|-id=470 bgcolor=#E9E9E9
| 385470 ||  || — || September 28, 2003 || Anderson Mesa || LONEOS || — || align=right | 1.6 km || 
|-id=471 bgcolor=#E9E9E9
| 385471 ||  || — || October 18, 2003 || Anderson Mesa || LONEOS || — || align=right | 2.9 km || 
|-id=472 bgcolor=#E9E9E9
| 385472 ||  || — || October 20, 2003 || Socorro || LINEAR || MAR || align=right | 1.3 km || 
|-id=473 bgcolor=#E9E9E9
| 385473 ||  || — || October 23, 2003 || Kitt Peak || Spacewatch || — || align=right | 2.4 km || 
|-id=474 bgcolor=#E9E9E9
| 385474 ||  || — || October 28, 2003 || Socorro || LINEAR || — || align=right | 2.5 km || 
|-id=475 bgcolor=#E9E9E9
| 385475 ||  || — || October 23, 2003 || Kitt Peak || M. W. Buie || — || align=right | 3.3 km || 
|-id=476 bgcolor=#E9E9E9
| 385476 ||  || — || October 18, 2003 || Apache Point || SDSS || EUN || align=right | 1.4 km || 
|-id=477 bgcolor=#fefefe
| 385477 ||  || — || November 15, 2003 || Kitt Peak || Spacewatch || — || align=right data-sort-value="0.60" | 600 m || 
|-id=478 bgcolor=#E9E9E9
| 385478 ||  || — || November 16, 2003 || Kitt Peak || Spacewatch || — || align=right | 2.9 km || 
|-id=479 bgcolor=#E9E9E9
| 385479 ||  || — || November 18, 2003 || Kitt Peak || Spacewatch || — || align=right | 2.4 km || 
|-id=480 bgcolor=#E9E9E9
| 385480 ||  || — || October 23, 2003 || Kitt Peak || Spacewatch || — || align=right | 2.2 km || 
|-id=481 bgcolor=#fefefe
| 385481 ||  || — || November 19, 2003 || Palomar || NEAT || FLO || align=right data-sort-value="0.56" | 560 m || 
|-id=482 bgcolor=#E9E9E9
| 385482 ||  || — || November 20, 2003 || Socorro || LINEAR || — || align=right | 2.7 km || 
|-id=483 bgcolor=#fefefe
| 385483 ||  || — || November 21, 2003 || Kitt Peak || Spacewatch || — || align=right data-sort-value="0.67" | 670 m || 
|-id=484 bgcolor=#E9E9E9
| 385484 ||  || — || November 20, 2003 || Socorro || LINEAR || — || align=right | 3.5 km || 
|-id=485 bgcolor=#E9E9E9
| 385485 ||  || — || October 23, 2003 || Kitt Peak || Spacewatch || GEF || align=right | 1.5 km || 
|-id=486 bgcolor=#fefefe
| 385486 ||  || — || November 20, 2003 || Kitt Peak || M. W. Buie || — || align=right data-sort-value="0.53" | 530 m || 
|-id=487 bgcolor=#fefefe
| 385487 ||  || — || December 19, 2003 || Kitt Peak || Spacewatch || — || align=right data-sort-value="0.73" | 730 m || 
|-id=488 bgcolor=#d6d6d6
| 385488 ||  || — || December 21, 2003 || Kitt Peak || Spacewatch || — || align=right | 3.2 km || 
|-id=489 bgcolor=#fefefe
| 385489 ||  || — || January 19, 2004 || Kitt Peak || Spacewatch || — || align=right data-sort-value="0.62" | 620 m || 
|-id=490 bgcolor=#d6d6d6
| 385490 ||  || — || January 27, 2004 || Kitt Peak || Spacewatch || — || align=right | 3.3 km || 
|-id=491 bgcolor=#d6d6d6
| 385491 ||  || — || January 29, 2004 || Kitt Peak || Spacewatch || — || align=right | 2.6 km || 
|-id=492 bgcolor=#fefefe
| 385492 ||  || — || February 13, 2004 || Kitt Peak || Spacewatch || H || align=right data-sort-value="0.61" | 610 m || 
|-id=493 bgcolor=#C2FFFF
| 385493 ||  || — || January 14, 2002 || Kitt Peak || Spacewatch || L4 || align=right | 9.1 km || 
|-id=494 bgcolor=#fefefe
| 385494 ||  || — || February 11, 2004 || Palomar || NEAT || H || align=right data-sort-value="0.52" | 520 m || 
|-id=495 bgcolor=#d6d6d6
| 385495 ||  || — || February 13, 2004 || Kitt Peak || Spacewatch || — || align=right | 4.3 km || 
|-id=496 bgcolor=#fefefe
| 385496 ||  || — || February 15, 2004 || Socorro || LINEAR || — || align=right | 1.1 km || 
|-id=497 bgcolor=#FFC2E0
| 385497 ||  || — || February 17, 2004 || Kitt Peak || Spacewatch || APO || align=right data-sort-value="0.57" | 570 m || 
|-id=498 bgcolor=#d6d6d6
| 385498 ||  || — || February 16, 2004 || Catalina || CSS || — || align=right | 3.9 km || 
|-id=499 bgcolor=#fefefe
| 385499 ||  || — || February 29, 2004 || Kitt Peak || Spacewatch || — || align=right data-sort-value="0.89" | 890 m || 
|-id=500 bgcolor=#d6d6d6
| 385500 ||  || — || February 17, 2004 || Kitt Peak || Spacewatch || TEL || align=right | 1.6 km || 
|}

385501–385600 

|-bgcolor=#fefefe
| 385501 ||  || — || March 15, 2004 || Socorro || LINEAR || H || align=right data-sort-value="0.70" | 700 m || 
|-id=502 bgcolor=#fefefe
| 385502 ||  || — || February 25, 2004 || Socorro || LINEAR || — || align=right data-sort-value="0.81" | 810 m || 
|-id=503 bgcolor=#fefefe
| 385503 ||  || — || March 15, 2004 || Catalina || CSS || — || align=right data-sort-value="0.83" | 830 m || 
|-id=504 bgcolor=#d6d6d6
| 385504 ||  || — || March 15, 2004 || Catalina || CSS || — || align=right | 3.3 km || 
|-id=505 bgcolor=#fefefe
| 385505 ||  || — || March 15, 2004 || Catalina || CSS || — || align=right data-sort-value="0.80" | 800 m || 
|-id=506 bgcolor=#d6d6d6
| 385506 ||  || — || March 15, 2004 || Socorro || LINEAR || — || align=right | 3.8 km || 
|-id=507 bgcolor=#fefefe
| 385507 ||  || — || March 17, 2004 || Socorro || LINEAR || H || align=right data-sort-value="0.73" | 730 m || 
|-id=508 bgcolor=#d6d6d6
| 385508 ||  || — || March 17, 2004 || Kitt Peak || Spacewatch || — || align=right | 3.1 km || 
|-id=509 bgcolor=#fefefe
| 385509 ||  || — || March 16, 2004 || Socorro || LINEAR || — || align=right | 1.0 km || 
|-id=510 bgcolor=#d6d6d6
| 385510 ||  || — || March 23, 2004 || Kitt Peak || Spacewatch || EOS || align=right | 1.6 km || 
|-id=511 bgcolor=#d6d6d6
| 385511 ||  || — || March 27, 2004 || Socorro || LINEAR || — || align=right | 2.8 km || 
|-id=512 bgcolor=#d6d6d6
| 385512 ||  || — || March 17, 2004 || Kitt Peak || Spacewatch || — || align=right | 2.9 km || 
|-id=513 bgcolor=#d6d6d6
| 385513 ||  || — || April 13, 2004 || Kitt Peak || Spacewatch || — || align=right | 2.8 km || 
|-id=514 bgcolor=#d6d6d6
| 385514 ||  || — || April 13, 2004 || Kitt Peak || Spacewatch || — || align=right | 2.5 km || 
|-id=515 bgcolor=#d6d6d6
| 385515 ||  || — || April 14, 2004 || Kitt Peak || Spacewatch || — || align=right | 3.3 km || 
|-id=516 bgcolor=#fefefe
| 385516 ||  || — || March 31, 2004 || Kitt Peak || Spacewatch || — || align=right data-sort-value="0.86" | 860 m || 
|-id=517 bgcolor=#d6d6d6
| 385517 ||  || — || April 19, 2004 || Socorro || LINEAR || — || align=right | 3.7 km || 
|-id=518 bgcolor=#d6d6d6
| 385518 ||  || — || April 21, 2004 || Catalina || CSS || — || align=right | 4.4 km || 
|-id=519 bgcolor=#d6d6d6
| 385519 ||  || — || April 21, 2004 || Kitt Peak || Spacewatch || — || align=right | 4.3 km || 
|-id=520 bgcolor=#d6d6d6
| 385520 ||  || — || May 12, 2004 || Catalina || CSS || — || align=right | 3.5 km || 
|-id=521 bgcolor=#fefefe
| 385521 ||  || — || May 27, 1997 || Kitt Peak || Spacewatch || — || align=right data-sort-value="0.91" | 910 m || 
|-id=522 bgcolor=#d6d6d6
| 385522 ||  || — || June 6, 2004 || Palomar || NEAT || — || align=right | 4.5 km || 
|-id=523 bgcolor=#d6d6d6
| 385523 ||  || — || June 11, 2004 || Socorro || LINEAR || EUP || align=right | 4.1 km || 
|-id=524 bgcolor=#E9E9E9
| 385524 ||  || — || June 29, 2004 || Siding Spring || SSS || — || align=right | 1.5 km || 
|-id=525 bgcolor=#fefefe
| 385525 ||  || — || July 9, 2004 || Palomar || NEAT || — || align=right | 1.2 km || 
|-id=526 bgcolor=#fefefe
| 385526 ||  || — || July 16, 2004 || Socorro || LINEAR || — || align=right | 1.0 km || 
|-id=527 bgcolor=#C2E0FF
| 385527 ||  || — || July 17, 2004 || Cerro Tololo || M. W. Buie || res4:7critical || align=right | 143 km || 
|-id=528 bgcolor=#C2E0FF
| 385528 ||  || — || July 22, 2004 || Mauna Kea || CFEPS || SDOcritical || align=right | 140 km || 
|-id=529 bgcolor=#fefefe
| 385529 ||  || — || August 6, 2004 || Palomar || NEAT || — || align=right | 1.2 km || 
|-id=530 bgcolor=#fefefe
| 385530 ||  || — || August 8, 2004 || Socorro || LINEAR || H || align=right data-sort-value="0.63" | 630 m || 
|-id=531 bgcolor=#E9E9E9
| 385531 ||  || — || August 9, 2004 || Socorro || LINEAR || EUN || align=right | 1.2 km || 
|-id=532 bgcolor=#fefefe
| 385532 ||  || — || August 10, 2004 || Socorro || LINEAR || H || align=right data-sort-value="0.82" | 820 m || 
|-id=533 bgcolor=#C2E0FF
| 385533 ||  || — || August 19, 2004 || Mauna Kea || B. Gladman || other TNOcritical || align=right | 176 km || 
|-id=534 bgcolor=#E9E9E9
| 385534 ||  || — || September 4, 2004 || Palomar || NEAT || — || align=right | 1.1 km || 
|-id=535 bgcolor=#fefefe
| 385535 ||  || — || September 8, 2004 || Socorro || LINEAR || H || align=right data-sort-value="0.63" | 630 m || 
|-id=536 bgcolor=#E9E9E9
| 385536 ||  || — || September 7, 2004 || Socorro || LINEAR || — || align=right | 1.2 km || 
|-id=537 bgcolor=#E9E9E9
| 385537 ||  || — || September 8, 2004 || Campo Imperatore || CINEOS || — || align=right | 1.0 km || 
|-id=538 bgcolor=#FA8072
| 385538 ||  || — || September 8, 2004 || Socorro || LINEAR || — || align=right | 1.2 km || 
|-id=539 bgcolor=#E9E9E9
| 385539 ||  || — || September 8, 2004 || Socorro || LINEAR || — || align=right | 1.2 km || 
|-id=540 bgcolor=#fefefe
| 385540 ||  || — || September 9, 2004 || Socorro || LINEAR || H || align=right data-sort-value="0.69" | 690 m || 
|-id=541 bgcolor=#E9E9E9
| 385541 ||  || — || September 10, 2004 || Socorro || LINEAR || — || align=right data-sort-value="0.99" | 990 m || 
|-id=542 bgcolor=#E9E9E9
| 385542 ||  || — || September 10, 2004 || Socorro || LINEAR || — || align=right data-sort-value="0.99" | 990 m || 
|-id=543 bgcolor=#E9E9E9
| 385543 ||  || — || September 10, 2004 || Socorro || LINEAR || — || align=right | 1.7 km || 
|-id=544 bgcolor=#E9E9E9
| 385544 ||  || — || September 9, 2004 || Kitt Peak || Spacewatch || — || align=right | 1.3 km || 
|-id=545 bgcolor=#E9E9E9
| 385545 ||  || — || September 10, 2004 || Kitt Peak || Spacewatch || — || align=right | 1.0 km || 
|-id=546 bgcolor=#fefefe
| 385546 ||  || — || September 10, 2004 || Kitt Peak || Spacewatch || — || align=right data-sort-value="0.77" | 770 m || 
|-id=547 bgcolor=#E9E9E9
| 385547 ||  || — || September 13, 2004 || Socorro || LINEAR || — || align=right | 1.5 km || 
|-id=548 bgcolor=#E9E9E9
| 385548 ||  || — || September 7, 2004 || Socorro || LINEAR || GER || align=right | 1.8 km || 
|-id=549 bgcolor=#E9E9E9
| 385549 ||  || — || September 17, 2004 || Socorro || LINEAR || — || align=right | 2.4 km || 
|-id=550 bgcolor=#E9E9E9
| 385550 ||  || — || September 22, 2004 || Socorro || LINEAR || INO || align=right | 3.1 km || 
|-id=551 bgcolor=#E9E9E9
| 385551 ||  || — || October 3, 2004 || Palomar || NEAT || — || align=right | 1.6 km || 
|-id=552 bgcolor=#E9E9E9
| 385552 ||  || — || October 4, 2004 || Kitt Peak || Spacewatch || — || align=right data-sort-value="0.98" | 980 m || 
|-id=553 bgcolor=#d6d6d6
| 385553 ||  || — || October 4, 2004 || Kitt Peak || Spacewatch || 3:2 || align=right | 4.0 km || 
|-id=554 bgcolor=#E9E9E9
| 385554 ||  || — || October 5, 2004 || Kitt Peak || Spacewatch || — || align=right | 1.4 km || 
|-id=555 bgcolor=#E9E9E9
| 385555 ||  || — || October 6, 2004 || Kitt Peak || Spacewatch || KON || align=right | 2.3 km || 
|-id=556 bgcolor=#E9E9E9
| 385556 ||  || — || October 6, 2004 || Kitt Peak || Spacewatch || — || align=right | 1.4 km || 
|-id=557 bgcolor=#E9E9E9
| 385557 ||  || — || October 6, 2004 || Kitt Peak || Spacewatch || — || align=right data-sort-value="0.87" | 870 m || 
|-id=558 bgcolor=#E9E9E9
| 385558 ||  || — || October 5, 2004 || Kitt Peak || Spacewatch || — || align=right data-sort-value="0.82" | 820 m || 
|-id=559 bgcolor=#E9E9E9
| 385559 ||  || — || October 5, 2004 || Kitt Peak || Spacewatch || — || align=right data-sort-value="0.74" | 740 m || 
|-id=560 bgcolor=#E9E9E9
| 385560 ||  || — || October 7, 2004 || Palomar || NEAT || — || align=right | 2.2 km || 
|-id=561 bgcolor=#fefefe
| 385561 ||  || — || October 4, 2004 || Kitt Peak || Spacewatch || — || align=right | 1.2 km || 
|-id=562 bgcolor=#E9E9E9
| 385562 ||  || — || October 6, 2004 || Kitt Peak || Spacewatch || — || align=right | 1.1 km || 
|-id=563 bgcolor=#E9E9E9
| 385563 ||  || — || October 6, 2004 || Kitt Peak || Spacewatch || — || align=right data-sort-value="0.85" | 850 m || 
|-id=564 bgcolor=#E9E9E9
| 385564 ||  || — || October 7, 2004 || Kitt Peak || Spacewatch || — || align=right data-sort-value="0.82" | 820 m || 
|-id=565 bgcolor=#E9E9E9
| 385565 ||  || — || October 7, 2004 || Kitt Peak || Spacewatch || — || align=right data-sort-value="0.82" | 820 m || 
|-id=566 bgcolor=#E9E9E9
| 385566 ||  || — || October 6, 2004 || Saint-Sulpice || Saint-Sulpice Obs. || — || align=right data-sort-value="0.88" | 880 m || 
|-id=567 bgcolor=#d6d6d6
| 385567 ||  || — || October 9, 2004 || Kitt Peak || Spacewatch || HIL3:2 || align=right | 5.7 km || 
|-id=568 bgcolor=#E9E9E9
| 385568 ||  || — || October 10, 2004 || Socorro || LINEAR || EUN || align=right | 1.3 km || 
|-id=569 bgcolor=#E9E9E9
| 385569 ||  || — || October 9, 2004 || Kitt Peak || Spacewatch || — || align=right | 1.3 km || 
|-id=570 bgcolor=#E9E9E9
| 385570 ||  || — || October 8, 2004 || Socorro || LINEAR || — || align=right | 1.3 km || 
|-id=571 bgcolor=#C2E0FF
| 385571 Otrera ||  ||  || October 16, 2004 || Las Campanas || S. S. Sheppard, C. Trujillo || NTcritical || align=right | 75 km || 
|-id=572 bgcolor=#E9E9E9
| 385572 ||  || — || November 4, 2004 || Needville || J. Dellinger, P. Garossino || — || align=right | 2.0 km || 
|-id=573 bgcolor=#E9E9E9
| 385573 ||  || — || November 3, 2004 || Kitt Peak || Spacewatch || — || align=right | 1.8 km || 
|-id=574 bgcolor=#E9E9E9
| 385574 ||  || — || November 4, 2004 || Kitt Peak || Spacewatch || — || align=right | 1.2 km || 
|-id=575 bgcolor=#E9E9E9
| 385575 ||  || — || November 5, 2004 || Palomar || NEAT || ADE || align=right | 2.0 km || 
|-id=576 bgcolor=#E9E9E9
| 385576 ||  || — || November 4, 2004 || Kitt Peak || Spacewatch || — || align=right | 1.2 km || 
|-id=577 bgcolor=#E9E9E9
| 385577 ||  || — || November 4, 2004 || Kitt Peak || Spacewatch || — || align=right | 1.7 km || 
|-id=578 bgcolor=#E9E9E9
| 385578 ||  || — || October 9, 2004 || Socorro || LINEAR || EUN || align=right | 1.4 km || 
|-id=579 bgcolor=#E9E9E9
| 385579 ||  || — || November 17, 2004 || CBA-East || CBA-East Obs. || — || align=right | 1.7 km || 
|-id=580 bgcolor=#FFC2E0
| 385580 ||  || — || December 10, 2004 || Catalina || CSS || AMO +1km || align=right | 2.1 km || 
|-id=581 bgcolor=#E9E9E9
| 385581 ||  || — || December 7, 2004 || Socorro || LINEAR || EUN || align=right | 1.3 km || 
|-id=582 bgcolor=#E9E9E9
| 385582 ||  || — || December 10, 2004 || Socorro || LINEAR || — || align=right | 2.1 km || 
|-id=583 bgcolor=#E9E9E9
| 385583 ||  || — || December 10, 2004 || Anderson Mesa || LONEOS || — || align=right | 2.8 km || 
|-id=584 bgcolor=#E9E9E9
| 385584 ||  || — || December 11, 2004 || Kitt Peak || Spacewatch || — || align=right | 2.1 km || 
|-id=585 bgcolor=#E9E9E9
| 385585 ||  || — || December 9, 2004 || Catalina || CSS || — || align=right | 1.6 km || 
|-id=586 bgcolor=#E9E9E9
| 385586 ||  || — || December 10, 2004 || Socorro || LINEAR || — || align=right | 1.4 km || 
|-id=587 bgcolor=#E9E9E9
| 385587 ||  || — || December 14, 2004 || Socorro || LINEAR || — || align=right | 1.3 km || 
|-id=588 bgcolor=#E9E9E9
| 385588 ||  || — || December 11, 2004 || Socorro || LINEAR || JUN || align=right | 1.3 km || 
|-id=589 bgcolor=#E9E9E9
| 385589 ||  || — || December 14, 2004 || Socorro || LINEAR || — || align=right | 2.4 km || 
|-id=590 bgcolor=#E9E9E9
| 385590 ||  || — || December 12, 2004 || Kitt Peak || Spacewatch || — || align=right | 2.2 km || 
|-id=591 bgcolor=#E9E9E9
| 385591 ||  || — || December 15, 2004 || Socorro || LINEAR || JUN || align=right | 1.1 km || 
|-id=592 bgcolor=#E9E9E9
| 385592 ||  || — || January 6, 2005 || Catalina || CSS || — || align=right | 2.3 km || 
|-id=593 bgcolor=#E9E9E9
| 385593 ||  || — || January 9, 2005 || Catalina || CSS || — || align=right | 2.5 km || 
|-id=594 bgcolor=#E9E9E9
| 385594 ||  || — || January 15, 2005 || Kitt Peak || Spacewatch || — || align=right | 1.7 km || 
|-id=595 bgcolor=#E9E9E9
| 385595 ||  || — || January 19, 2005 || Socorro || LINEAR || — || align=right | 1.7 km || 
|-id=596 bgcolor=#E9E9E9
| 385596 ||  || — || February 2, 2005 || Socorro || LINEAR || — || align=right | 2.1 km || 
|-id=597 bgcolor=#E9E9E9
| 385597 ||  || — || February 2, 2005 || Kitt Peak || Spacewatch || — || align=right | 2.7 km || 
|-id=598 bgcolor=#E9E9E9
| 385598 ||  || — || March 2, 2005 || Kitt Peak || Spacewatch || — || align=right | 2.2 km || 
|-id=599 bgcolor=#d6d6d6
| 385599 ||  || — || March 4, 2005 || Socorro || LINEAR || TIR || align=right | 3.1 km || 
|-id=600 bgcolor=#E9E9E9
| 385600 ||  || — || March 4, 2005 || Socorro || LINEAR || — || align=right | 2.2 km || 
|}

385601–385700 

|-bgcolor=#d6d6d6
| 385601 ||  || — || March 4, 2005 || Mount Lemmon || Mount Lemmon Survey || KOR || align=right | 1.2 km || 
|-id=602 bgcolor=#E9E9E9
| 385602 ||  || — || March 9, 2005 || Mount Lemmon || Mount Lemmon Survey || NEM || align=right | 2.2 km || 
|-id=603 bgcolor=#E9E9E9
| 385603 ||  || — || March 9, 2005 || Mount Lemmon || Mount Lemmon Survey || — || align=right | 2.3 km || 
|-id=604 bgcolor=#E9E9E9
| 385604 ||  || — || March 13, 2005 || Mount Lemmon || Mount Lemmon Survey || GAL || align=right | 1.6 km || 
|-id=605 bgcolor=#FFC2E0
| 385605 ||  || — || March 14, 2005 || Mount Lemmon || Mount Lemmon Survey || APOPHAcritical || align=right data-sort-value="0.56" | 560 m || 
|-id=606 bgcolor=#E9E9E9
| 385606 ||  || — || March 9, 2005 || Socorro || LINEAR || — || align=right | 3.6 km || 
|-id=607 bgcolor=#C2E0FF
| 385607 ||  || — || March 11, 2005 || Kitt Peak || M. W. Buie || res1:3critical || align=right | 161 km || 
|-id=608 bgcolor=#E9E9E9
| 385608 ||  || — || March 11, 2005 || Kitt Peak || Spacewatch || — || align=right | 2.6 km || 
|-id=609 bgcolor=#E9E9E9
| 385609 ||  || — || April 1, 2005 || Anderson Mesa || LONEOS || — || align=right | 3.7 km || 
|-id=610 bgcolor=#fefefe
| 385610 ||  || — || April 6, 2005 || Kitt Peak || Spacewatch || — || align=right data-sort-value="0.62" | 620 m || 
|-id=611 bgcolor=#E9E9E9
| 385611 ||  || — || April 2, 2005 || Catalina || CSS || INO || align=right | 1.2 km || 
|-id=612 bgcolor=#E9E9E9
| 385612 ||  || — || April 6, 2005 || Mount Lemmon || Mount Lemmon Survey || AGN || align=right | 1.5 km || 
|-id=613 bgcolor=#d6d6d6
| 385613 ||  || — || April 6, 2005 || Kitt Peak || Spacewatch || TRP || align=right | 3.7 km || 
|-id=614 bgcolor=#E9E9E9
| 385614 ||  || — || April 10, 2005 || Kitt Peak || Spacewatch || MRX || align=right | 1.2 km || 
|-id=615 bgcolor=#E9E9E9
| 385615 ||  || — || April 9, 2005 || Catalina || CSS || POS || align=right | 3.2 km || 
|-id=616 bgcolor=#fefefe
| 385616 ||  || — || May 13, 2005 || Kitt Peak || Spacewatch || — || align=right data-sort-value="0.86" | 860 m || 
|-id=617 bgcolor=#fefefe
| 385617 ||  || — || June 30, 2005 || Kitt Peak || Spacewatch || — || align=right data-sort-value="0.81" | 810 m || 
|-id=618 bgcolor=#d6d6d6
| 385618 ||  || — || June 30, 2005 || Kitt Peak || Spacewatch || URS || align=right | 4.5 km || 
|-id=619 bgcolor=#fefefe
| 385619 ||  || — || June 30, 2005 || Kitt Peak || Spacewatch || FLO || align=right data-sort-value="0.57" | 570 m || 
|-id=620 bgcolor=#d6d6d6
| 385620 ||  || — || June 1, 2005 || Mount Lemmon || Mount Lemmon Survey || — || align=right | 3.3 km || 
|-id=621 bgcolor=#fefefe
| 385621 ||  || — || June 28, 2005 || Kitt Peak || Spacewatch || — || align=right data-sort-value="0.97" | 970 m || 
|-id=622 bgcolor=#fefefe
| 385622 ||  || — || July 3, 2005 || Mount Lemmon || Mount Lemmon Survey || MAS || align=right data-sort-value="0.78" | 780 m || 
|-id=623 bgcolor=#d6d6d6
| 385623 ||  || — || July 3, 2005 || Mount Lemmon || Mount Lemmon Survey || — || align=right | 3.6 km || 
|-id=624 bgcolor=#d6d6d6
| 385624 ||  || — || July 1, 2005 || Kitt Peak || Spacewatch || — || align=right | 3.3 km || 
|-id=625 bgcolor=#fefefe
| 385625 ||  || — || July 4, 2005 || Kitt Peak || Spacewatch || NYS || align=right data-sort-value="0.64" | 640 m || 
|-id=626 bgcolor=#d6d6d6
| 385626 ||  || — || July 4, 2005 || Palomar || NEAT || URS || align=right | 3.5 km || 
|-id=627 bgcolor=#d6d6d6
| 385627 ||  || — || July 6, 2005 || Kitt Peak || Spacewatch || — || align=right | 3.2 km || 
|-id=628 bgcolor=#fefefe
| 385628 ||  || — || July 2, 2005 || Kitt Peak || Spacewatch || NYS || align=right | 1.8 km || 
|-id=629 bgcolor=#d6d6d6
| 385629 ||  || — || July 30, 2005 || Palomar || NEAT || — || align=right | 2.9 km || 
|-id=630 bgcolor=#fefefe
| 385630 ||  || — || July 28, 2005 || Palomar || NEAT || — || align=right | 1.1 km || 
|-id=631 bgcolor=#fefefe
| 385631 ||  || — || August 27, 2005 || Kitt Peak || Spacewatch || NYS || align=right data-sort-value="0.51" | 510 m || 
|-id=632 bgcolor=#fefefe
| 385632 ||  || — || August 27, 2005 || Haleakala || NEAT || — || align=right | 1.1 km || 
|-id=633 bgcolor=#d6d6d6
| 385633 ||  || — || August 29, 2005 || Vicques || M. Ory || ALA || align=right | 3.8 km || 
|-id=634 bgcolor=#d6d6d6
| 385634 ||  || — || July 12, 2005 || Anderson Mesa || LONEOS || — || align=right | 4.8 km || 
|-id=635 bgcolor=#fefefe
| 385635 ||  || — || August 29, 2005 || Anderson Mesa || LONEOS || — || align=right | 1.1 km || 
|-id=636 bgcolor=#FA8072
| 385636 ||  || — || August 30, 2005 || Kitt Peak || Spacewatch || — || align=right | 1.1 km || 
|-id=637 bgcolor=#fefefe
| 385637 ||  || — || August 29, 2005 || Saint-Véran || Saint-Véran Obs. || MAS || align=right data-sort-value="0.78" | 780 m || 
|-id=638 bgcolor=#fefefe
| 385638 ||  || — || August 27, 2005 || Palomar || NEAT || NYS || align=right data-sort-value="0.74" | 740 m || 
|-id=639 bgcolor=#d6d6d6
| 385639 ||  || — || August 28, 2005 || Kitt Peak || Spacewatch || — || align=right | 3.2 km || 
|-id=640 bgcolor=#fefefe
| 385640 ||  || — || August 28, 2005 || Kitt Peak || Spacewatch || NYS || align=right data-sort-value="0.73" | 730 m || 
|-id=641 bgcolor=#fefefe
| 385641 ||  || — || August 28, 2005 || Kitt Peak || Spacewatch || — || align=right data-sort-value="0.66" | 660 m || 
|-id=642 bgcolor=#fefefe
| 385642 ||  || — || August 28, 2005 || Kitt Peak || Spacewatch || NYS || align=right data-sort-value="0.70" | 700 m || 
|-id=643 bgcolor=#fefefe
| 385643 ||  || — || August 28, 2005 || Kitt Peak || Spacewatch || — || align=right data-sort-value="0.82" | 820 m || 
|-id=644 bgcolor=#fefefe
| 385644 ||  || — || August 28, 2005 || Kitt Peak || Spacewatch || MAS || align=right data-sort-value="0.64" | 640 m || 
|-id=645 bgcolor=#fefefe
| 385645 ||  || — || August 31, 2005 || Kitt Peak || Spacewatch || V || align=right data-sort-value="0.61" | 610 m || 
|-id=646 bgcolor=#fefefe
| 385646 ||  || — || August 31, 2005 || Kitt Peak || Spacewatch || — || align=right data-sort-value="0.76" | 760 m || 
|-id=647 bgcolor=#d6d6d6
| 385647 ||  || — || August 29, 2005 || Kitt Peak || Spacewatch || — || align=right | 3.5 km || 
|-id=648 bgcolor=#fefefe
| 385648 ||  || — || August 31, 2005 || Anderson Mesa || LONEOS || V || align=right data-sort-value="0.71" | 710 m || 
|-id=649 bgcolor=#fefefe
| 385649 ||  || — || August 31, 2005 || Kitt Peak || Spacewatch || V || align=right data-sort-value="0.59" | 590 m || 
|-id=650 bgcolor=#fefefe
| 385650 ||  || — || September 11, 2005 || Junk Bond || D. Healy || MAS || align=right data-sort-value="0.69" | 690 m || 
|-id=651 bgcolor=#fefefe
| 385651 ||  || — || September 1, 2005 || Kitt Peak || Spacewatch || — || align=right data-sort-value="0.69" | 690 m || 
|-id=652 bgcolor=#d6d6d6
| 385652 ||  || — || September 6, 2005 || Anderson Mesa || LONEOS || — || align=right | 3.2 km || 
|-id=653 bgcolor=#fefefe
| 385653 ||  || — || August 29, 2005 || Kitt Peak || Spacewatch || — || align=right data-sort-value="0.94" | 940 m || 
|-id=654 bgcolor=#fefefe
| 385654 ||  || — || September 10, 2005 || Anderson Mesa || LONEOS || — || align=right | 1.2 km || 
|-id=655 bgcolor=#fefefe
| 385655 ||  || — || September 6, 2005 || Anderson Mesa || LONEOS || FLO || align=right data-sort-value="0.77" | 770 m || 
|-id=656 bgcolor=#d6d6d6
| 385656 ||  || — || September 10, 2005 || Anderson Mesa || LONEOS || — || align=right | 3.7 km || 
|-id=657 bgcolor=#fefefe
| 385657 ||  || — || September 25, 2005 || Catalina || CSS || — || align=right | 1.2 km || 
|-id=658 bgcolor=#FA8072
| 385658 ||  || — || September 26, 2005 || Kitt Peak || Spacewatch || H || align=right data-sort-value="0.77" | 770 m || 
|-id=659 bgcolor=#fefefe
| 385659 ||  || — || September 23, 2005 || Kitt Peak || Spacewatch || — || align=right data-sort-value="0.86" | 860 m || 
|-id=660 bgcolor=#fefefe
| 385660 ||  || — || September 24, 2005 || Kitt Peak || Spacewatch || NYS || align=right data-sort-value="0.74" | 740 m || 
|-id=661 bgcolor=#fefefe
| 385661 ||  || — || September 24, 2005 || Kitt Peak || Spacewatch || ERI || align=right | 1.7 km || 
|-id=662 bgcolor=#fefefe
| 385662 ||  || — || September 24, 2005 || Kitt Peak || Spacewatch || NYS || align=right data-sort-value="0.56" | 560 m || 
|-id=663 bgcolor=#fefefe
| 385663 ||  || — || September 25, 2005 || Kitt Peak || Spacewatch || CLA || align=right | 1.9 km || 
|-id=664 bgcolor=#fefefe
| 385664 ||  || — || September 25, 2005 || Kitt Peak || Spacewatch || — || align=right data-sort-value="0.86" | 860 m || 
|-id=665 bgcolor=#d6d6d6
| 385665 ||  || — || September 25, 2005 || Kitt Peak || Spacewatch || — || align=right | 3.7 km || 
|-id=666 bgcolor=#fefefe
| 385666 ||  || — || September 25, 2005 || Kitt Peak || Spacewatch || V || align=right data-sort-value="0.71" | 710 m || 
|-id=667 bgcolor=#fefefe
| 385667 ||  || — || September 27, 2005 || Kitt Peak || Spacewatch || MAS || align=right data-sort-value="0.73" | 730 m || 
|-id=668 bgcolor=#fefefe
| 385668 ||  || — || September 29, 2005 || Mount Lemmon || Mount Lemmon Survey || MAS || align=right data-sort-value="0.86" | 860 m || 
|-id=669 bgcolor=#fefefe
| 385669 ||  || — || September 25, 2005 || Kitt Peak || Spacewatch || V || align=right data-sort-value="0.75" | 750 m || 
|-id=670 bgcolor=#fefefe
| 385670 ||  || — || September 25, 2005 || Kitt Peak || Spacewatch || — || align=right data-sort-value="0.71" | 710 m || 
|-id=671 bgcolor=#fefefe
| 385671 ||  || — || September 14, 2005 || Catalina || CSS || — || align=right | 1.3 km || 
|-id=672 bgcolor=#fefefe
| 385672 ||  || — || September 29, 2005 || Kitt Peak || Spacewatch || V || align=right data-sort-value="0.67" | 670 m || 
|-id=673 bgcolor=#fefefe
| 385673 ||  || — || September 29, 2005 || Anderson Mesa || LONEOS || NYS || align=right data-sort-value="0.70" | 700 m || 
|-id=674 bgcolor=#fefefe
| 385674 ||  || — || September 29, 2005 || Kitt Peak || Spacewatch || — || align=right | 1.00 km || 
|-id=675 bgcolor=#fefefe
| 385675 ||  || — || September 29, 2005 || Mount Lemmon || Mount Lemmon Survey || MAS || align=right data-sort-value="0.68" | 680 m || 
|-id=676 bgcolor=#fefefe
| 385676 ||  || — || September 29, 2005 || Mount Lemmon || Mount Lemmon Survey || NYS || align=right data-sort-value="0.66" | 660 m || 
|-id=677 bgcolor=#fefefe
| 385677 ||  || — || September 30, 2005 || Kitt Peak || Spacewatch || — || align=right data-sort-value="0.80" | 800 m || 
|-id=678 bgcolor=#fefefe
| 385678 ||  || — || September 30, 2005 || Anderson Mesa || LONEOS || — || align=right data-sort-value="0.95" | 950 m || 
|-id=679 bgcolor=#fefefe
| 385679 ||  || — || September 30, 2005 || Mount Lemmon || Mount Lemmon Survey || MAS || align=right data-sort-value="0.83" | 830 m || 
|-id=680 bgcolor=#fefefe
| 385680 ||  || — || September 30, 2005 || Mount Lemmon || Mount Lemmon Survey || MAS || align=right data-sort-value="0.55" | 550 m || 
|-id=681 bgcolor=#fefefe
| 385681 ||  || — || September 30, 2005 || Palomar || NEAT || — || align=right | 1.1 km || 
|-id=682 bgcolor=#fefefe
| 385682 ||  || — || September 30, 2005 || Kitt Peak || Spacewatch || MAS || align=right data-sort-value="0.76" | 760 m || 
|-id=683 bgcolor=#fefefe
| 385683 ||  || — || September 30, 2005 || Mount Lemmon || Mount Lemmon Survey || MAS || align=right data-sort-value="0.82" | 820 m || 
|-id=684 bgcolor=#fefefe
| 385684 ||  || — || September 24, 2005 || Palomar || NEAT || NYSfast? || align=right data-sort-value="0.62" | 620 m || 
|-id=685 bgcolor=#fefefe
| 385685 ||  || — || September 22, 2005 || Palomar || NEAT || FLO || align=right data-sort-value="0.76" | 760 m || 
|-id=686 bgcolor=#d6d6d6
| 385686 ||  || — || September 23, 2005 || Kitt Peak || Spacewatch || EUP || align=right | 4.8 km || 
|-id=687 bgcolor=#fefefe
| 385687 ||  || — || September 25, 2005 || Apache Point || A. C. Becker || — || align=right | 1.6 km || 
|-id=688 bgcolor=#fefefe
| 385688 ||  || — || October 1, 2005 || Kitt Peak || Spacewatch || MAS || align=right data-sort-value="0.76" | 760 m || 
|-id=689 bgcolor=#d6d6d6
| 385689 ||  || — || October 1, 2005 || Kitt Peak || Spacewatch || TIR || align=right | 3.3 km || 
|-id=690 bgcolor=#fefefe
| 385690 ||  || — || September 14, 2005 || Kitt Peak || Spacewatch || — || align=right data-sort-value="0.80" | 800 m || 
|-id=691 bgcolor=#fefefe
| 385691 ||  || — || September 30, 2005 || Mount Lemmon || Mount Lemmon Survey || NYS || align=right data-sort-value="0.70" | 700 m || 
|-id=692 bgcolor=#fefefe
| 385692 ||  || — || October 5, 2005 || Kitt Peak || Spacewatch || — || align=right data-sort-value="0.83" | 830 m || 
|-id=693 bgcolor=#fefefe
| 385693 ||  || — || October 11, 2005 || Junk Bond || D. Healy || ERI || align=right | 1.5 km || 
|-id=694 bgcolor=#fefefe
| 385694 ||  || — || October 3, 2005 || Kitt Peak || Spacewatch || V || align=right data-sort-value="0.69" | 690 m || 
|-id=695 bgcolor=#C2E0FF
| 385695 Clete ||  ||  || October 8, 2005 || Las Campanas || C. Trujillo, S. S. Sheppard || NT || align=right | 97 km || 
|-id=696 bgcolor=#d6d6d6
| 385696 ||  || — || October 7, 2005 || Catalina || CSS || 7:4 || align=right | 4.0 km || 
|-id=697 bgcolor=#fefefe
| 385697 ||  || — || September 30, 2005 || Catalina || CSS || — || align=right | 1.3 km || 
|-id=698 bgcolor=#fefefe
| 385698 ||  || — || September 27, 2005 || Kitt Peak || Spacewatch || NYS || align=right data-sort-value="0.73" | 730 m || 
|-id=699 bgcolor=#fefefe
| 385699 ||  || — || October 7, 2005 || Kitt Peak || Spacewatch || NYS || align=right data-sort-value="0.69" | 690 m || 
|-id=700 bgcolor=#fefefe
| 385700 ||  || — || October 7, 2005 || Mount Lemmon || Mount Lemmon Survey || — || align=right data-sort-value="0.87" | 870 m || 
|}

385701–385800 

|-bgcolor=#fefefe
| 385701 ||  || — || October 1, 2005 || Mount Lemmon || Mount Lemmon Survey || FLO || align=right data-sort-value="0.76" | 760 m || 
|-id=702 bgcolor=#fefefe
| 385702 ||  || — || October 21, 2005 || Palomar || NEAT || — || align=right data-sort-value="0.72" | 720 m || 
|-id=703 bgcolor=#fefefe
| 385703 ||  || — || October 22, 2005 || Kitt Peak || Spacewatch || — || align=right data-sort-value="0.67" | 670 m || 
|-id=704 bgcolor=#fefefe
| 385704 ||  || — || October 1, 2005 || Mount Lemmon || Mount Lemmon Survey || MAS || align=right data-sort-value="0.82" | 820 m || 
|-id=705 bgcolor=#fefefe
| 385705 ||  || — || October 23, 2005 || Kitt Peak || Spacewatch || NYS || align=right data-sort-value="0.85" | 850 m || 
|-id=706 bgcolor=#fefefe
| 385706 ||  || — || October 23, 2005 || Catalina || CSS || MAS || align=right data-sort-value="0.85" | 850 m || 
|-id=707 bgcolor=#fefefe
| 385707 ||  || — || October 22, 2005 || Kitt Peak || Spacewatch || MAS || align=right data-sort-value="0.67" | 670 m || 
|-id=708 bgcolor=#fefefe
| 385708 ||  || — || October 23, 2005 || Kitt Peak || Spacewatch || NYS || align=right data-sort-value="0.73" | 730 m || 
|-id=709 bgcolor=#fefefe
| 385709 ||  || — || October 25, 2005 || Mount Lemmon || Mount Lemmon Survey || H || align=right data-sort-value="0.77" | 770 m || 
|-id=710 bgcolor=#fefefe
| 385710 ||  || — || October 23, 2005 || Catalina || CSS || — || align=right | 1.1 km || 
|-id=711 bgcolor=#fefefe
| 385711 ||  || — || October 22, 2005 || Kitt Peak || Spacewatch || — || align=right data-sort-value="0.76" | 760 m || 
|-id=712 bgcolor=#fefefe
| 385712 ||  || — || October 22, 2005 || Palomar || NEAT || NYS || align=right data-sort-value="0.66" | 660 m || 
|-id=713 bgcolor=#fefefe
| 385713 ||  || — || October 22, 2005 || Kitt Peak || Spacewatch || NYS || align=right data-sort-value="0.60" | 600 m || 
|-id=714 bgcolor=#fefefe
| 385714 ||  || — || October 22, 2005 || Kitt Peak || Spacewatch || MAS || align=right data-sort-value="0.88" | 880 m || 
|-id=715 bgcolor=#fefefe
| 385715 ||  || — || October 24, 2005 || Kitt Peak || Spacewatch || — || align=right data-sort-value="0.77" | 770 m || 
|-id=716 bgcolor=#fefefe
| 385716 ||  || — || October 24, 2005 || Kitt Peak || Spacewatch || NYS || align=right data-sort-value="0.78" | 780 m || 
|-id=717 bgcolor=#fefefe
| 385717 ||  || — || October 24, 2005 || Kitt Peak || Spacewatch || MAS || align=right data-sort-value="0.57" | 570 m || 
|-id=718 bgcolor=#fefefe
| 385718 ||  || — || October 26, 2005 || Kitt Peak || Spacewatch || MAS || align=right data-sort-value="0.66" | 660 m || 
|-id=719 bgcolor=#fefefe
| 385719 ||  || — || October 27, 2005 || Kitt Peak || Spacewatch || — || align=right data-sort-value="0.69" | 690 m || 
|-id=720 bgcolor=#fefefe
| 385720 ||  || — || October 22, 2005 || Catalina || CSS || — || align=right | 1.9 km || 
|-id=721 bgcolor=#fefefe
| 385721 ||  || — || October 24, 2005 || Kitt Peak || Spacewatch || NYS || align=right data-sort-value="0.69" | 690 m || 
|-id=722 bgcolor=#fefefe
| 385722 ||  || — || October 25, 2005 || Kitt Peak || Spacewatch || MAS || align=right data-sort-value="0.64" | 640 m || 
|-id=723 bgcolor=#fefefe
| 385723 ||  || — || October 28, 2005 || Socorro || LINEAR || MAS || align=right data-sort-value="0.90" | 900 m || 
|-id=724 bgcolor=#fefefe
| 385724 ||  || — || October 28, 2005 || Kitt Peak || Spacewatch || V || align=right data-sort-value="0.58" | 580 m || 
|-id=725 bgcolor=#fefefe
| 385725 ||  || — || October 26, 2005 || Kitt Peak || Spacewatch || — || align=right data-sort-value="0.78" | 780 m || 
|-id=726 bgcolor=#fefefe
| 385726 ||  || — || October 26, 2005 || Kitt Peak || Spacewatch || V || align=right data-sort-value="0.72" | 720 m || 
|-id=727 bgcolor=#fefefe
| 385727 ||  || — || March 11, 2003 || Kitt Peak || Spacewatch || MAS || align=right data-sort-value="0.68" | 680 m || 
|-id=728 bgcolor=#fefefe
| 385728 ||  || — || October 23, 2005 || Catalina || CSS || — || align=right data-sort-value="0.85" | 850 m || 
|-id=729 bgcolor=#fefefe
| 385729 ||  || — || October 27, 2005 || Mount Lemmon || Mount Lemmon Survey || — || align=right | 1.0 km || 
|-id=730 bgcolor=#fefefe
| 385730 ||  || — || October 25, 2005 || Kitt Peak || Spacewatch || NYS || align=right data-sort-value="0.88" | 880 m || 
|-id=731 bgcolor=#fefefe
| 385731 ||  || — || October 28, 2005 || Catalina || CSS || ERI || align=right | 1.6 km || 
|-id=732 bgcolor=#fefefe
| 385732 ||  || — || October 31, 2005 || Socorro || LINEAR || H || align=right | 1.0 km || 
|-id=733 bgcolor=#fefefe
| 385733 ||  || — || October 29, 2005 || Catalina || CSS || — || align=right | 1.1 km || 
|-id=734 bgcolor=#fefefe
| 385734 ||  || — || October 30, 2005 || Catalina || CSS || H || align=right data-sort-value="0.95" | 950 m || 
|-id=735 bgcolor=#fefefe
| 385735 ||  || — || November 4, 2005 || Socorro || LINEAR || NYS || align=right data-sort-value="0.76" | 760 m || 
|-id=736 bgcolor=#fefefe
| 385736 ||  || — || November 1, 2005 || Mount Lemmon || Mount Lemmon Survey || NYS || align=right data-sort-value="0.66" | 660 m || 
|-id=737 bgcolor=#fefefe
| 385737 ||  || — || November 4, 2005 || Mount Lemmon || Mount Lemmon Survey || NYS || align=right data-sort-value="0.63" | 630 m || 
|-id=738 bgcolor=#fefefe
| 385738 ||  || — || November 10, 2005 || Mount Lemmon || Mount Lemmon Survey || MAS || align=right data-sort-value="0.84" | 840 m || 
|-id=739 bgcolor=#fefefe
| 385739 ||  || — || November 1, 2005 || Apache Point || A. C. Becker || V || align=right data-sort-value="0.69" | 690 m || 
|-id=740 bgcolor=#E9E9E9
| 385740 ||  || — || November 25, 2005 || Mount Lemmon || Mount Lemmon Survey || — || align=right data-sort-value="0.98" | 980 m || 
|-id=741 bgcolor=#fefefe
| 385741 ||  || — || October 31, 2005 || Kitt Peak || Spacewatch || V || align=right data-sort-value="0.72" | 720 m || 
|-id=742 bgcolor=#fefefe
| 385742 ||  || — || October 30, 2005 || Socorro || LINEAR || V || align=right data-sort-value="0.70" | 700 m || 
|-id=743 bgcolor=#fefefe
| 385743 ||  || — || November 26, 2005 || Kitt Peak || Spacewatch || NYS || align=right data-sort-value="0.80" | 800 m || 
|-id=744 bgcolor=#fefefe
| 385744 ||  || — || November 26, 2005 || Mount Lemmon || Mount Lemmon Survey || MAS || align=right data-sort-value="0.74" | 740 m || 
|-id=745 bgcolor=#fefefe
| 385745 ||  || — || November 26, 2005 || Catalina || CSS || H || align=right data-sort-value="0.77" | 770 m || 
|-id=746 bgcolor=#fefefe
| 385746 ||  || — || December 2, 2005 || Kitt Peak || Spacewatch || — || align=right data-sort-value="0.85" | 850 m || 
|-id=747 bgcolor=#fefefe
| 385747 ||  || — || December 1, 2005 || Mount Lemmon || Mount Lemmon Survey || MAS || align=right data-sort-value="0.76" | 760 m || 
|-id=748 bgcolor=#fefefe
| 385748 ||  || — || December 2, 2005 || Catalina || CSS || H || align=right | 1.0 km || 
|-id=749 bgcolor=#E9E9E9
| 385749 ||  || — || December 2, 2005 || Kitt Peak || Spacewatch || — || align=right | 2.5 km || 
|-id=750 bgcolor=#E9E9E9
| 385750 ||  || — || December 2, 2005 || Kitt Peak || M. W. Buie || — || align=right | 2.1 km || 
|-id=751 bgcolor=#E9E9E9
| 385751 ||  || — || December 22, 2005 || Kitt Peak || Spacewatch || — || align=right | 1.5 km || 
|-id=752 bgcolor=#E9E9E9
| 385752 ||  || — || December 22, 2005 || Kitt Peak || Spacewatch || — || align=right data-sort-value="0.91" | 910 m || 
|-id=753 bgcolor=#fefefe
| 385753 ||  || — || December 23, 2005 || Kitt Peak || Spacewatch || CIM || align=right | 2.1 km || 
|-id=754 bgcolor=#fefefe
| 385754 ||  || — || December 24, 2005 || Kitt Peak || Spacewatch || EUT || align=right data-sort-value="0.85" | 850 m || 
|-id=755 bgcolor=#fefefe
| 385755 ||  || — || December 24, 2005 || Kitt Peak || Spacewatch || — || align=right data-sort-value="0.98" | 980 m || 
|-id=756 bgcolor=#fefefe
| 385756 ||  || — || December 22, 2005 || Kitt Peak || Spacewatch || MAS || align=right data-sort-value="0.76" | 760 m || 
|-id=757 bgcolor=#E9E9E9
| 385757 ||  || — || December 22, 2005 || Kitt Peak || Spacewatch || — || align=right | 2.2 km || 
|-id=758 bgcolor=#E9E9E9
| 385758 ||  || — || December 25, 2005 || Kitt Peak || Spacewatch || — || align=right data-sort-value="0.75" | 750 m || 
|-id=759 bgcolor=#fefefe
| 385759 ||  || — || December 26, 2005 || Kitt Peak || Spacewatch || NYS || align=right data-sort-value="0.69" | 690 m || 
|-id=760 bgcolor=#E9E9E9
| 385760 ||  || — || December 24, 2005 || Kitt Peak || Spacewatch || — || align=right | 1.6 km || 
|-id=761 bgcolor=#fefefe
| 385761 ||  || — || December 8, 2005 || Kitt Peak || Spacewatch || — || align=right data-sort-value="0.74" | 740 m || 
|-id=762 bgcolor=#fefefe
| 385762 ||  || — || December 24, 2005 || Kitt Peak || Spacewatch || — || align=right data-sort-value="0.82" | 820 m || 
|-id=763 bgcolor=#fefefe
| 385763 ||  || — || December 24, 2005 || Kitt Peak || Spacewatch || — || align=right data-sort-value="0.90" | 900 m || 
|-id=764 bgcolor=#E9E9E9
| 385764 ||  || — || December 24, 2005 || Kitt Peak || Spacewatch || MAR || align=right | 1.1 km || 
|-id=765 bgcolor=#E9E9E9
| 385765 ||  || — || December 25, 2005 || Kitt Peak || Spacewatch || — || align=right | 1.7 km || 
|-id=766 bgcolor=#E9E9E9
| 385766 ||  || — || December 28, 2005 || Catalina || CSS || — || align=right | 1.1 km || 
|-id=767 bgcolor=#fefefe
| 385767 ||  || — || December 28, 2005 || Mount Lemmon || Mount Lemmon Survey || NYS || align=right data-sort-value="0.97" | 970 m || 
|-id=768 bgcolor=#fefefe
| 385768 ||  || — || December 28, 2005 || Mount Lemmon || Mount Lemmon Survey || — || align=right data-sort-value="0.71" | 710 m || 
|-id=769 bgcolor=#E9E9E9
| 385769 ||  || — || December 28, 2005 || Mount Lemmon || Mount Lemmon Survey || EUN || align=right data-sort-value="0.96" | 960 m || 
|-id=770 bgcolor=#E9E9E9
| 385770 ||  || — || December 30, 2005 || Kitt Peak || Spacewatch || — || align=right | 1.2 km || 
|-id=771 bgcolor=#fefefe
| 385771 ||  || — || December 28, 2005 || Catalina || CSS || H || align=right data-sort-value="0.59" | 590 m || 
|-id=772 bgcolor=#d6d6d6
| 385772 ||  || — || December 22, 2005 || Kitt Peak || Spacewatch || — || align=right | 2.5 km || 
|-id=773 bgcolor=#fefefe
| 385773 ||  || — || December 28, 2005 || Mount Lemmon || Mount Lemmon Survey || — || align=right | 1.2 km || 
|-id=774 bgcolor=#fefefe
| 385774 ||  || — || December 25, 2005 || Kitt Peak || Spacewatch || — || align=right data-sort-value="0.91" | 910 m || 
|-id=775 bgcolor=#fefefe
| 385775 ||  || — || December 5, 2005 || Catalina || CSS || H || align=right data-sort-value="0.91" | 910 m || 
|-id=776 bgcolor=#fefefe
| 385776 ||  || — || January 4, 2006 || Kitt Peak || Spacewatch || SUL || align=right | 1.6 km || 
|-id=777 bgcolor=#E9E9E9
| 385777 ||  || — || January 5, 2006 || Kitt Peak || Spacewatch || — || align=right data-sort-value="0.85" | 850 m || 
|-id=778 bgcolor=#FA8072
| 385778 ||  || — || January 4, 2006 || Catalina || CSS || H || align=right data-sort-value="0.91" | 910 m || 
|-id=779 bgcolor=#fefefe
| 385779 ||  || — || January 6, 2006 || Kitt Peak || Spacewatch || H || align=right data-sort-value="0.61" | 610 m || 
|-id=780 bgcolor=#d6d6d6
| 385780 ||  || — || January 9, 2006 || Kitt Peak || Spacewatch || SHU3:2 || align=right | 4.9 km || 
|-id=781 bgcolor=#fefefe
| 385781 ||  || — || January 20, 2006 || Socorro || LINEAR || H || align=right data-sort-value="0.65" | 650 m || 
|-id=782 bgcolor=#d6d6d6
| 385782 ||  || — || January 23, 2006 || Kitt Peak || Spacewatch || 3:2 || align=right | 3.4 km || 
|-id=783 bgcolor=#d6d6d6
| 385783 ||  || — || December 24, 2005 || Kitt Peak || Spacewatch || SHU3:2 || align=right | 5.1 km || 
|-id=784 bgcolor=#E9E9E9
| 385784 ||  || — || January 23, 2006 || Kitt Peak || Spacewatch || — || align=right | 1.2 km || 
|-id=785 bgcolor=#E9E9E9
| 385785 ||  || — || January 23, 2006 || Kitt Peak || Spacewatch || — || align=right | 1.0 km || 
|-id=786 bgcolor=#E9E9E9
| 385786 ||  || — || January 23, 2006 || Kitt Peak || Spacewatch || — || align=right data-sort-value="0.82" | 820 m || 
|-id=787 bgcolor=#E9E9E9
| 385787 ||  || — || January 23, 2006 || Kitt Peak || Spacewatch || — || align=right data-sort-value="0.97" | 970 m || 
|-id=788 bgcolor=#E9E9E9
| 385788 ||  || — || January 25, 2006 || Kitt Peak || Spacewatch || — || align=right data-sort-value="0.94" | 940 m || 
|-id=789 bgcolor=#E9E9E9
| 385789 ||  || — || January 23, 2006 || Kitt Peak || Spacewatch || — || align=right data-sort-value="0.87" | 870 m || 
|-id=790 bgcolor=#E9E9E9
| 385790 ||  || — || January 25, 2006 || Kitt Peak || Spacewatch || — || align=right | 1.2 km || 
|-id=791 bgcolor=#E9E9E9
| 385791 ||  || — || January 25, 2006 || Kitt Peak || Spacewatch || HNS || align=right | 1.3 km || 
|-id=792 bgcolor=#E9E9E9
| 385792 ||  || — || January 26, 2006 || Kitt Peak || Spacewatch || — || align=right | 1.2 km || 
|-id=793 bgcolor=#fefefe
| 385793 ||  || — || January 27, 2006 || Anderson Mesa || LONEOS || V || align=right data-sort-value="0.88" | 880 m || 
|-id=794 bgcolor=#E9E9E9
| 385794 ||  || — || January 27, 2006 || Mount Lemmon || Mount Lemmon Survey || — || align=right data-sort-value="0.87" | 870 m || 
|-id=795 bgcolor=#E9E9E9
| 385795 ||  || — || January 31, 2006 || Kitt Peak || Spacewatch || — || align=right data-sort-value="0.71" | 710 m || 
|-id=796 bgcolor=#E9E9E9
| 385796 ||  || — || January 30, 2006 || Kitt Peak || Spacewatch || — || align=right | 1.0 km || 
|-id=797 bgcolor=#d6d6d6
| 385797 ||  || — || January 30, 2006 || Kitt Peak || Spacewatch || — || align=right | 2.1 km || 
|-id=798 bgcolor=#E9E9E9
| 385798 ||  || — || January 30, 2006 || Kitt Peak || Spacewatch || — || align=right data-sort-value="0.92" | 920 m || 
|-id=799 bgcolor=#fefefe
| 385799 ||  || — || February 3, 2006 || Socorro || LINEAR || H || align=right data-sort-value="0.70" | 700 m || 
|-id=800 bgcolor=#fefefe
| 385800 ||  || — || February 3, 2006 || Socorro || LINEAR || H || align=right data-sort-value="0.66" | 660 m || 
|}

385801–385900 

|-bgcolor=#E9E9E9
| 385801 ||  || — || February 1, 2006 || Kitt Peak || Spacewatch || — || align=right | 1.1 km || 
|-id=802 bgcolor=#E9E9E9
| 385802 ||  || — || February 21, 2006 || Catalina || CSS || — || align=right | 1.4 km || 
|-id=803 bgcolor=#E9E9E9
| 385803 ||  || — || February 20, 2006 || Kitt Peak || Spacewatch || ADE || align=right | 2.1 km || 
|-id=804 bgcolor=#E9E9E9
| 385804 ||  || — || February 20, 2006 || Kitt Peak || Spacewatch || — || align=right | 2.2 km || 
|-id=805 bgcolor=#E9E9E9
| 385805 ||  || — || February 20, 2006 || Mount Lemmon || Mount Lemmon Survey || — || align=right | 2.5 km || 
|-id=806 bgcolor=#E9E9E9
| 385806 ||  || — || February 24, 2006 || Kitt Peak || Spacewatch || — || align=right data-sort-value="0.83" | 830 m || 
|-id=807 bgcolor=#E9E9E9
| 385807 ||  || — || February 24, 2006 || Catalina || CSS || — || align=right | 3.0 km || 
|-id=808 bgcolor=#fefefe
| 385808 ||  || — || February 22, 2006 || Catalina || CSS || H || align=right data-sort-value="0.74" | 740 m || 
|-id=809 bgcolor=#E9E9E9
| 385809 ||  || — || February 24, 2006 || Mount Lemmon || Mount Lemmon Survey || — || align=right data-sort-value="0.75" | 750 m || 
|-id=810 bgcolor=#E9E9E9
| 385810 ||  || — || February 20, 2006 || Catalina || CSS || — || align=right | 4.5 km || 
|-id=811 bgcolor=#E9E9E9
| 385811 ||  || — || January 23, 2006 || Kitt Peak || Spacewatch || — || align=right | 2.8 km || 
|-id=812 bgcolor=#E9E9E9
| 385812 ||  || — || February 27, 2006 || Kitt Peak || Spacewatch || KON || align=right | 2.4 km || 
|-id=813 bgcolor=#E9E9E9
| 385813 ||  || — || February 27, 2006 || Mount Lemmon || Mount Lemmon Survey || — || align=right data-sort-value="0.84" | 840 m || 
|-id=814 bgcolor=#E9E9E9
| 385814 ||  || — || February 27, 2006 || Catalina || CSS || — || align=right | 2.3 km || 
|-id=815 bgcolor=#E9E9E9
| 385815 ||  || — || March 2, 2006 || Kitt Peak || Spacewatch || — || align=right | 1.2 km || 
|-id=816 bgcolor=#E9E9E9
| 385816 ||  || — || March 3, 2006 || Kitt Peak || Spacewatch || — || align=right data-sort-value="0.89" | 890 m || 
|-id=817 bgcolor=#E9E9E9
| 385817 ||  || — || March 2, 2006 || Mount Lemmon || Mount Lemmon Survey || — || align=right | 1.6 km || 
|-id=818 bgcolor=#E9E9E9
| 385818 ||  || — || March 23, 2006 || Kitt Peak || Spacewatch || — || align=right | 1.5 km || 
|-id=819 bgcolor=#E9E9E9
| 385819 ||  || — || March 23, 2006 || Kitt Peak || Spacewatch || — || align=right | 1.3 km || 
|-id=820 bgcolor=#E9E9E9
| 385820 ||  || — || March 24, 2006 || Mount Lemmon || Mount Lemmon Survey || — || align=right | 2.3 km || 
|-id=821 bgcolor=#E9E9E9
| 385821 ||  || — || March 24, 2006 || Catalina || CSS || — || align=right | 2.1 km || 
|-id=822 bgcolor=#E9E9E9
| 385822 ||  || — || March 24, 2006 || Kitt Peak || Spacewatch || — || align=right | 2.2 km || 
|-id=823 bgcolor=#E9E9E9
| 385823 ||  || — || March 9, 2006 || Kitt Peak || Spacewatch || — || align=right | 1.1 km || 
|-id=824 bgcolor=#E9E9E9
| 385824 ||  || — || April 2, 2006 || Kitt Peak || Spacewatch || — || align=right | 1.1 km || 
|-id=825 bgcolor=#E9E9E9
| 385825 ||  || — || April 2, 2006 || Kitt Peak || Spacewatch || — || align=right | 2.9 km || 
|-id=826 bgcolor=#E9E9E9
| 385826 ||  || — || April 2, 2006 || Kitt Peak || Spacewatch || — || align=right | 1.2 km || 
|-id=827 bgcolor=#E9E9E9
| 385827 ||  || — || April 6, 2006 || Catalina || CSS || JUN || align=right | 1.5 km || 
|-id=828 bgcolor=#E9E9E9
| 385828 ||  || — || April 7, 2006 || Kitt Peak || Spacewatch || — || align=right | 1.8 km || 
|-id=829 bgcolor=#E9E9E9
| 385829 ||  || — || April 8, 2006 || Kitt Peak || Spacewatch || DOR || align=right | 2.0 km || 
|-id=830 bgcolor=#E9E9E9
| 385830 ||  || — || April 18, 2006 || Kitt Peak || Spacewatch || — || align=right | 2.0 km || 
|-id=831 bgcolor=#E9E9E9
| 385831 ||  || — || December 18, 2004 || Mount Lemmon || Mount Lemmon Survey || WIT || align=right | 1.0 km || 
|-id=832 bgcolor=#E9E9E9
| 385832 ||  || — || April 20, 2006 || Kitt Peak || Spacewatch || — || align=right | 1.4 km || 
|-id=833 bgcolor=#E9E9E9
| 385833 ||  || — || April 18, 2006 || Anderson Mesa || LONEOS || JUN || align=right | 1.1 km || 
|-id=834 bgcolor=#E9E9E9
| 385834 ||  || — || April 24, 2006 || Mount Lemmon || Mount Lemmon Survey || EUN || align=right | 1.4 km || 
|-id=835 bgcolor=#E9E9E9
| 385835 ||  || — || April 25, 2006 || Kitt Peak || Spacewatch || — || align=right | 2.1 km || 
|-id=836 bgcolor=#E9E9E9
| 385836 ||  || — || April 25, 2006 || Kitt Peak || Spacewatch || — || align=right | 2.3 km || 
|-id=837 bgcolor=#E9E9E9
| 385837 ||  || — || April 26, 2006 || Kitt Peak || Spacewatch || — || align=right | 2.9 km || 
|-id=838 bgcolor=#E9E9E9
| 385838 ||  || — || April 29, 2006 || Kitt Peak || Spacewatch || — || align=right | 1.4 km || 
|-id=839 bgcolor=#E9E9E9
| 385839 ||  || — || April 30, 2006 || Kitt Peak || Spacewatch || ADE || align=right | 2.9 km || 
|-id=840 bgcolor=#E9E9E9
| 385840 ||  || — || April 23, 2006 || Catalina || CSS || BAR || align=right | 1.1 km || 
|-id=841 bgcolor=#E9E9E9
| 385841 ||  || — || April 30, 2006 || Catalina || CSS || RAF || align=right | 1.3 km || 
|-id=842 bgcolor=#E9E9E9
| 385842 ||  || — || April 30, 2006 || Kitt Peak || Spacewatch || — || align=right | 3.3 km || 
|-id=843 bgcolor=#FFC2E0
| 385843 ||  || — || May 6, 2006 || Mount Lemmon || Mount Lemmon Survey || APO || align=right data-sort-value="0.28" | 280 m || 
|-id=844 bgcolor=#E9E9E9
| 385844 ||  || — || May 4, 2006 || Kitt Peak || Spacewatch || — || align=right | 2.7 km || 
|-id=845 bgcolor=#E9E9E9
| 385845 ||  || — || May 18, 2006 || Palomar || NEAT || — || align=right | 3.0 km || 
|-id=846 bgcolor=#E9E9E9
| 385846 ||  || — || March 23, 2006 || Kitt Peak || Spacewatch || — || align=right | 1.4 km || 
|-id=847 bgcolor=#E9E9E9
| 385847 ||  || — || September 27, 2003 || Kitt Peak || Spacewatch || — || align=right | 1.4 km || 
|-id=848 bgcolor=#d6d6d6
| 385848 ||  || — || May 1, 2006 || Kitt Peak || Spacewatch || KOR || align=right | 1.6 km || 
|-id=849 bgcolor=#E9E9E9
| 385849 ||  || — || May 22, 2006 || Kitt Peak || Spacewatch || — || align=right | 1.7 km || 
|-id=850 bgcolor=#E9E9E9
| 385850 ||  || — || May 24, 2006 || Kitt Peak || Spacewatch || — || align=right | 3.3 km || 
|-id=851 bgcolor=#E9E9E9
| 385851 ||  || — || June 5, 2006 || Socorro || LINEAR || — || align=right | 1.6 km || 
|-id=852 bgcolor=#E9E9E9
| 385852 ||  || — || July 22, 2006 || Palomar || NEAT || — || align=right | 2.7 km || 
|-id=853 bgcolor=#d6d6d6
| 385853 ||  || — || August 12, 2006 || Palomar || NEAT || YAK || align=right | 3.5 km || 
|-id=854 bgcolor=#d6d6d6
| 385854 ||  || — || August 19, 2006 || Piszkéstető || K. Sárneczky, Z. Kuli || EUP || align=right | 3.7 km || 
|-id=855 bgcolor=#d6d6d6
| 385855 ||  || — || August 25, 2006 || Socorro || LINEAR || — || align=right | 3.2 km || 
|-id=856 bgcolor=#d6d6d6
| 385856 ||  || — || August 28, 2006 || Kitt Peak || Spacewatch || URS || align=right | 3.6 km || 
|-id=857 bgcolor=#d6d6d6
| 385857 ||  || — || August 16, 2006 || Palomar || NEAT || KOR || align=right | 2.0 km || 
|-id=858 bgcolor=#d6d6d6
| 385858 ||  || — || August 19, 2006 || Kitt Peak || Spacewatch || — || align=right | 3.2 km || 
|-id=859 bgcolor=#d6d6d6
| 385859 ||  || — || August 19, 2006 || Kitt Peak || Spacewatch || — || align=right | 3.1 km || 
|-id=860 bgcolor=#d6d6d6
| 385860 ||  || — || August 19, 2006 || Kitt Peak || Spacewatch || — || align=right | 2.2 km || 
|-id=861 bgcolor=#E9E9E9
| 385861 ||  || — || April 5, 2005 || Mount Lemmon || Mount Lemmon Survey || — || align=right | 2.2 km || 
|-id=862 bgcolor=#d6d6d6
| 385862 ||  || — || August 18, 2006 || Kitt Peak || Spacewatch || — || align=right | 3.3 km || 
|-id=863 bgcolor=#d6d6d6
| 385863 ||  || — || September 14, 2006 || Kitt Peak || Spacewatch || — || align=right | 3.1 km || 
|-id=864 bgcolor=#d6d6d6
| 385864 ||  || — || August 27, 2006 || Anderson Mesa || LONEOS || EUP || align=right | 3.7 km || 
|-id=865 bgcolor=#d6d6d6
| 385865 ||  || — || September 15, 2006 || Kitt Peak || Spacewatch || — || align=right | 2.8 km || 
|-id=866 bgcolor=#d6d6d6
| 385866 ||  || — || September 15, 2006 || Goodricke-Pigott || R. A. Tucker || — || align=right | 3.6 km || 
|-id=867 bgcolor=#d6d6d6
| 385867 ||  || — || September 15, 2006 || Kitt Peak || Spacewatch || EOS || align=right | 1.8 km || 
|-id=868 bgcolor=#d6d6d6
| 385868 ||  || — || September 12, 2006 || Catalina || CSS || — || align=right | 3.3 km || 
|-id=869 bgcolor=#d6d6d6
| 385869 ||  || — || September 12, 2006 || Catalina || CSS || LIX || align=right | 4.1 km || 
|-id=870 bgcolor=#d6d6d6
| 385870 ||  || — || September 14, 2006 || Kitt Peak || Spacewatch || HYG || align=right | 2.8 km || 
|-id=871 bgcolor=#d6d6d6
| 385871 ||  || — || September 15, 2006 || Kitt Peak || Spacewatch || — || align=right | 3.1 km || 
|-id=872 bgcolor=#d6d6d6
| 385872 ||  || — || September 15, 2006 || Kitt Peak || Spacewatch || EOS || align=right | 2.5 km || 
|-id=873 bgcolor=#d6d6d6
| 385873 ||  || — || September 15, 2006 || Kitt Peak || Spacewatch || — || align=right | 2.5 km || 
|-id=874 bgcolor=#fefefe
| 385874 ||  || — || September 15, 2006 || Kitt Peak || Spacewatch || — || align=right data-sort-value="0.53" | 530 m || 
|-id=875 bgcolor=#FA8072
| 385875 ||  || — || September 1, 2006 || Siding Spring || SSS || PHO || align=right | 1.2 km || 
|-id=876 bgcolor=#fefefe
| 385876 ||  || — || September 17, 2006 || Kitt Peak || Spacewatch || — || align=right data-sort-value="0.76" | 760 m || 
|-id=877 bgcolor=#d6d6d6
| 385877 ||  || — || September 17, 2006 || Catalina || CSS || — || align=right | 3.4 km || 
|-id=878 bgcolor=#d6d6d6
| 385878 ||  || — || September 17, 2006 || Kitt Peak || Spacewatch || — || align=right | 2.9 km || 
|-id=879 bgcolor=#fefefe
| 385879 ||  || — || September 17, 2006 || Anderson Mesa || LONEOS || FLO || align=right data-sort-value="0.58" | 580 m || 
|-id=880 bgcolor=#fefefe
| 385880 ||  || — || September 18, 2006 || Calvin-Rehoboth || Calvin–Rehoboth Obs. || — || align=right data-sort-value="0.59" | 590 m || 
|-id=881 bgcolor=#fefefe
| 385881 ||  || — || September 18, 2006 || Kitt Peak || Spacewatch || — || align=right data-sort-value="0.72" | 720 m || 
|-id=882 bgcolor=#fefefe
| 385882 ||  || — || September 18, 2006 || Kitt Peak || Spacewatch || — || align=right data-sort-value="0.63" | 630 m || 
|-id=883 bgcolor=#d6d6d6
| 385883 ||  || — || September 20, 2006 || Catalina || CSS || — || align=right | 4.3 km || 
|-id=884 bgcolor=#FA8072
| 385884 ||  || — || September 26, 2006 || Catalina || CSS || — || align=right data-sort-value="0.33" | 330 m || 
|-id=885 bgcolor=#fefefe
| 385885 ||  || — || September 25, 2006 || Anderson Mesa || LONEOS || — || align=right data-sort-value="0.85" | 850 m || 
|-id=886 bgcolor=#d6d6d6
| 385886 ||  || — || September 23, 2006 || Kitt Peak || Spacewatch || — || align=right | 2.6 km || 
|-id=887 bgcolor=#d6d6d6
| 385887 ||  || — || September 25, 2006 || Kitt Peak || Spacewatch || ARM || align=right | 3.8 km || 
|-id=888 bgcolor=#d6d6d6
| 385888 ||  || — || September 25, 2006 || Anderson Mesa || LONEOS || — || align=right | 4.7 km || 
|-id=889 bgcolor=#fefefe
| 385889 ||  || — || September 25, 2006 || Kitt Peak || Spacewatch || — || align=right data-sort-value="0.78" | 780 m || 
|-id=890 bgcolor=#d6d6d6
| 385890 ||  || — || September 26, 2006 || Kitt Peak || Spacewatch || — || align=right | 2.6 km || 
|-id=891 bgcolor=#d6d6d6
| 385891 ||  || — || September 26, 2006 || Kitt Peak || Spacewatch || — || align=right | 2.9 km || 
|-id=892 bgcolor=#d6d6d6
| 385892 ||  || — || September 26, 2006 || Kitt Peak || Spacewatch || EOS || align=right | 2.0 km || 
|-id=893 bgcolor=#d6d6d6
| 385893 ||  || — || September 26, 2006 || Kitt Peak || Spacewatch || — || align=right | 3.8 km || 
|-id=894 bgcolor=#d6d6d6
| 385894 ||  || — || September 26, 2006 || Kitt Peak || Spacewatch || — || align=right | 2.7 km || 
|-id=895 bgcolor=#d6d6d6
| 385895 ||  || — || September 18, 2006 || Kitt Peak || Spacewatch || EOS || align=right | 2.5 km || 
|-id=896 bgcolor=#d6d6d6
| 385896 ||  || — || September 19, 2006 || Kitt Peak || Spacewatch || EOS || align=right | 2.2 km || 
|-id=897 bgcolor=#fefefe
| 385897 ||  || — || April 17, 2005 || Kitt Peak || Spacewatch || — || align=right data-sort-value="0.62" | 620 m || 
|-id=898 bgcolor=#fefefe
| 385898 ||  || — || September 27, 2006 || Mount Lemmon || Mount Lemmon Survey || — || align=right data-sort-value="0.84" | 840 m || 
|-id=899 bgcolor=#d6d6d6
| 385899 ||  || — || September 27, 2006 || Kitt Peak || Spacewatch || EOS || align=right | 2.4 km || 
|-id=900 bgcolor=#d6d6d6
| 385900 ||  || — || September 27, 2006 || Kitt Peak || Spacewatch || — || align=right | 2.6 km || 
|}

385901–386000 

|-bgcolor=#fefefe
| 385901 ||  || — || September 28, 2006 || Kitt Peak || Spacewatch || — || align=right data-sort-value="0.81" | 810 m || 
|-id=902 bgcolor=#d6d6d6
| 385902 ||  || — || September 30, 2006 || Catalina || CSS || — || align=right | 3.3 km || 
|-id=903 bgcolor=#d6d6d6
| 385903 ||  || — || September 30, 2006 || Mount Lemmon || Mount Lemmon Survey || — || align=right | 3.4 km || 
|-id=904 bgcolor=#d6d6d6
| 385904 ||  || — || September 17, 2006 || Apache Point || A. C. Becker || HYG || align=right | 3.1 km || 
|-id=905 bgcolor=#d6d6d6
| 385905 ||  || — || September 17, 2006 || Apache Point || A. C. Becker || — || align=right | 2.7 km || 
|-id=906 bgcolor=#d6d6d6
| 385906 ||  || — || September 19, 2006 || Apache Point || A. C. Becker || THM || align=right | 2.0 km || 
|-id=907 bgcolor=#d6d6d6
| 385907 ||  || — || September 29, 2006 || Apache Point || A. C. Becker || URS || align=right | 3.3 km || 
|-id=908 bgcolor=#d6d6d6
| 385908 ||  || — || September 18, 2006 || Kitt Peak || Spacewatch || HYG || align=right | 2.9 km || 
|-id=909 bgcolor=#d6d6d6
| 385909 ||  || — || September 26, 2006 || Mount Lemmon || Mount Lemmon Survey || THM || align=right | 2.6 km || 
|-id=910 bgcolor=#d6d6d6
| 385910 ||  || — || September 25, 2006 || Mount Lemmon || Mount Lemmon Survey || — || align=right | 3.0 km || 
|-id=911 bgcolor=#fefefe
| 385911 ||  || — || September 28, 2006 || Mount Lemmon || Mount Lemmon Survey || FLO || align=right data-sort-value="0.41" | 410 m || 
|-id=912 bgcolor=#fefefe
| 385912 ||  || — || September 30, 2006 || Mount Lemmon || Mount Lemmon Survey || FLO || align=right data-sort-value="0.58" | 580 m || 
|-id=913 bgcolor=#fefefe
| 385913 ||  || — || September 26, 2006 || Mount Lemmon || Mount Lemmon Survey || — || align=right data-sort-value="0.73" | 730 m || 
|-id=914 bgcolor=#fefefe
| 385914 ||  || — || September 25, 2006 || Mount Lemmon || Mount Lemmon Survey || — || align=right data-sort-value="0.62" | 620 m || 
|-id=915 bgcolor=#fefefe
| 385915 ||  || — || October 12, 2006 || Kitt Peak || Spacewatch || — || align=right data-sort-value="0.68" | 680 m || 
|-id=916 bgcolor=#d6d6d6
| 385916 ||  || — || October 12, 2006 || Kitt Peak || Spacewatch || — || align=right | 2.7 km || 
|-id=917 bgcolor=#fefefe
| 385917 ||  || — || October 12, 2006 || Kitt Peak || Spacewatch || — || align=right data-sort-value="0.65" | 650 m || 
|-id=918 bgcolor=#fefefe
| 385918 ||  || — || October 12, 2006 || Kitt Peak || Spacewatch || — || align=right data-sort-value="0.62" | 620 m || 
|-id=919 bgcolor=#fefefe
| 385919 ||  || — || October 12, 2006 || Kitt Peak || Spacewatch || — || align=right data-sort-value="0.71" | 710 m || 
|-id=920 bgcolor=#fefefe
| 385920 ||  || — || September 26, 2006 || Kitt Peak || Spacewatch || — || align=right data-sort-value="0.68" | 680 m || 
|-id=921 bgcolor=#d6d6d6
| 385921 ||  || — || October 11, 2006 || Palomar || NEAT || HYG || align=right | 3.3 km || 
|-id=922 bgcolor=#fefefe
| 385922 ||  || — || October 15, 2006 || Kitt Peak || Spacewatch || — || align=right data-sort-value="0.80" | 800 m || 
|-id=923 bgcolor=#d6d6d6
| 385923 ||  || — || October 15, 2006 || Kitt Peak || Spacewatch || HYG || align=right | 2.8 km || 
|-id=924 bgcolor=#d6d6d6
| 385924 ||  || — || October 1, 2006 || Apache Point || A. C. Becker || EOS || align=right | 1.9 km || 
|-id=925 bgcolor=#d6d6d6
| 385925 ||  || — || October 1, 2006 || Apache Point || A. C. Becker || — || align=right | 3.4 km || 
|-id=926 bgcolor=#d6d6d6
| 385926 ||  || — || October 2, 2006 || Apache Point || A. C. Becker || — || align=right | 3.0 km || 
|-id=927 bgcolor=#d6d6d6
| 385927 ||  || — || October 2, 2006 || Apache Point || A. C. Becker || LIX || align=right | 4.2 km || 
|-id=928 bgcolor=#d6d6d6
| 385928 ||  || — || October 16, 2006 || Kitt Peak || Spacewatch || — || align=right | 3.5 km || 
|-id=929 bgcolor=#fefefe
| 385929 ||  || — || September 26, 2006 || Mount Lemmon || Mount Lemmon Survey || — || align=right data-sort-value="0.51" | 510 m || 
|-id=930 bgcolor=#fefefe
| 385930 ||  || — || October 17, 2006 || Kitt Peak || Spacewatch || — || align=right data-sort-value="0.65" | 650 m || 
|-id=931 bgcolor=#d6d6d6
| 385931 ||  || — || October 16, 2006 || Catalina || CSS || — || align=right | 3.6 km || 
|-id=932 bgcolor=#d6d6d6
| 385932 ||  || — || October 17, 2006 || Kitt Peak || Spacewatch || — || align=right | 2.8 km || 
|-id=933 bgcolor=#fefefe
| 385933 ||  || — || October 17, 2006 || Mount Lemmon || Mount Lemmon Survey || — || align=right data-sort-value="0.84" | 840 m || 
|-id=934 bgcolor=#fefefe
| 385934 ||  || — || October 17, 2006 || Kitt Peak || Spacewatch || FLO || align=right data-sort-value="0.92" | 920 m || 
|-id=935 bgcolor=#d6d6d6
| 385935 ||  || — || October 2, 2006 || Mount Lemmon || Mount Lemmon Survey || — || align=right | 3.5 km || 
|-id=936 bgcolor=#fefefe
| 385936 ||  || — || October 18, 2006 || Kitt Peak || Spacewatch || — || align=right data-sort-value="0.61" | 610 m || 
|-id=937 bgcolor=#d6d6d6
| 385937 ||  || — || October 19, 2006 || Kitt Peak || Spacewatch || — || align=right | 2.8 km || 
|-id=938 bgcolor=#fefefe
| 385938 ||  || — || September 25, 2006 || Kitt Peak || Spacewatch || — || align=right data-sort-value="0.73" | 730 m || 
|-id=939 bgcolor=#fefefe
| 385939 ||  || — || October 19, 2006 || Kitt Peak || Spacewatch || — || align=right data-sort-value="0.58" | 580 m || 
|-id=940 bgcolor=#fefefe
| 385940 ||  || — || October 19, 2006 || Kitt Peak || Spacewatch || FLO || align=right data-sort-value="0.47" | 470 m || 
|-id=941 bgcolor=#fefefe
| 385941 ||  || — || October 19, 2006 || Kitt Peak || Spacewatch || FLO || align=right data-sort-value="0.56" | 560 m || 
|-id=942 bgcolor=#fefefe
| 385942 ||  || — || October 19, 2006 || Catalina || CSS || — || align=right data-sort-value="0.82" | 820 m || 
|-id=943 bgcolor=#d6d6d6
| 385943 ||  || — || September 28, 2006 || Catalina || CSS || — || align=right | 4.7 km || 
|-id=944 bgcolor=#d6d6d6
| 385944 ||  || — || September 28, 2006 || Catalina || CSS || — || align=right | 3.3 km || 
|-id=945 bgcolor=#fefefe
| 385945 ||  || — || October 20, 2006 || Kitt Peak || Spacewatch || — || align=right data-sort-value="0.62" | 620 m || 
|-id=946 bgcolor=#d6d6d6
| 385946 ||  || — || October 12, 2006 || Kitt Peak || Spacewatch || — || align=right | 2.8 km || 
|-id=947 bgcolor=#fefefe
| 385947 ||  || — || October 27, 2006 || Mount Lemmon || Mount Lemmon Survey || FLO || align=right data-sort-value="0.80" | 800 m || 
|-id=948 bgcolor=#fefefe
| 385948 ||  || — || October 17, 2006 || Catalina || CSS || — || align=right data-sort-value="0.87" | 870 m || 
|-id=949 bgcolor=#fefefe
| 385949 ||  || — || October 27, 2006 || Catalina || CSS || FLO || align=right data-sort-value="0.80" | 800 m || 
|-id=950 bgcolor=#d6d6d6
| 385950 ||  || — || October 19, 2006 || Kitt Peak || M. W. Buie || EOS || align=right | 2.3 km || 
|-id=951 bgcolor=#fefefe
| 385951 ||  || — || November 9, 2006 || Kitt Peak || Spacewatch || — || align=right data-sort-value="0.68" | 680 m || 
|-id=952 bgcolor=#fefefe
| 385952 ||  || — || November 10, 2006 || Kitt Peak || Spacewatch || — || align=right data-sort-value="0.86" | 860 m || 
|-id=953 bgcolor=#fefefe
| 385953 ||  || — || November 10, 2006 || Kitt Peak || Spacewatch || — || align=right data-sort-value="0.99" | 990 m || 
|-id=954 bgcolor=#fefefe
| 385954 ||  || — || November 10, 2006 || Kitt Peak || Spacewatch || — || align=right data-sort-value="0.85" | 850 m || 
|-id=955 bgcolor=#fefefe
| 385955 ||  || — || November 12, 2006 || Mount Lemmon || Mount Lemmon Survey || FLO || align=right data-sort-value="0.64" | 640 m || 
|-id=956 bgcolor=#d6d6d6
| 385956 ||  || — || November 11, 2006 || Kitt Peak || Spacewatch || 7:4 || align=right | 2.7 km || 
|-id=957 bgcolor=#d6d6d6
| 385957 ||  || — || October 19, 2006 || Mount Lemmon || Mount Lemmon Survey || SYL7:4 || align=right | 3.2 km || 
|-id=958 bgcolor=#fefefe
| 385958 ||  || — || November 11, 2006 || Kitt Peak || Spacewatch || — || align=right data-sort-value="0.84" | 840 m || 
|-id=959 bgcolor=#d6d6d6
| 385959 ||  || — || October 3, 2006 || Mount Lemmon || Mount Lemmon Survey || — || align=right | 3.6 km || 
|-id=960 bgcolor=#fefefe
| 385960 ||  || — || November 14, 2006 || Catalina || CSS || — || align=right data-sort-value="0.75" | 750 m || 
|-id=961 bgcolor=#d6d6d6
| 385961 ||  || — || October 3, 2006 || Kitt Peak || Spacewatch || — || align=right | 2.8 km || 
|-id=962 bgcolor=#d6d6d6
| 385962 ||  || — || November 13, 2006 || Kitt Peak || Spacewatch || — || align=right | 3.5 km || 
|-id=963 bgcolor=#d6d6d6
| 385963 ||  || — || November 16, 2006 || Kitt Peak || Spacewatch || — || align=right | 3.0 km || 
|-id=964 bgcolor=#fefefe
| 385964 ||  || — || November 22, 2006 || Catalina || CSS || FLO || align=right data-sort-value="0.70" | 700 m || 
|-id=965 bgcolor=#fefefe
| 385965 ||  || — || November 23, 2006 || Kitt Peak || Spacewatch || — || align=right data-sort-value="0.82" | 820 m || 
|-id=966 bgcolor=#fefefe
| 385966 ||  || — || November 23, 2006 || Kitt Peak || Spacewatch || — || align=right data-sort-value="0.61" | 610 m || 
|-id=967 bgcolor=#fefefe
| 385967 ||  || — || November 23, 2006 || Kitt Peak || Spacewatch || — || align=right data-sort-value="0.75" | 750 m || 
|-id=968 bgcolor=#fefefe
| 385968 ||  || — || November 23, 2006 || Kitt Peak || Spacewatch || FLO || align=right data-sort-value="0.64" | 640 m || 
|-id=969 bgcolor=#fefefe
| 385969 ||  || — || November 25, 2006 || Kitt Peak || Spacewatch || FLO || align=right data-sort-value="0.69" | 690 m || 
|-id=970 bgcolor=#fefefe
| 385970 ||  || — || November 25, 2006 || Mount Lemmon || Mount Lemmon Survey || — || align=right data-sort-value="0.94" | 940 m || 
|-id=971 bgcolor=#fefefe
| 385971 ||  || — || November 20, 2006 || Kitt Peak || Spacewatch || FLO || align=right data-sort-value="0.71" | 710 m || 
|-id=972 bgcolor=#fefefe
| 385972 ||  || — || November 29, 2006 || Socorro || LINEAR || — || align=right data-sort-value="0.90" | 900 m || 
|-id=973 bgcolor=#fefefe
| 385973 ||  || — || December 7, 2006 || Palomar || NEAT || — || align=right data-sort-value="0.78" | 780 m || 
|-id=974 bgcolor=#fefefe
| 385974 ||  || — || December 10, 2006 || Kitt Peak || Spacewatch || — || align=right data-sort-value="0.89" | 890 m || 
|-id=975 bgcolor=#fefefe
| 385975 ||  || — || December 14, 2006 || Kitt Peak || Spacewatch || — || align=right data-sort-value="0.57" | 570 m || 
|-id=976 bgcolor=#fefefe
| 385976 ||  || — || December 20, 2006 || Mount Lemmon || Mount Lemmon Survey || — || align=right data-sort-value="0.91" | 910 m || 
|-id=977 bgcolor=#fefefe
| 385977 ||  || — || December 21, 2006 || Kitt Peak || Spacewatch || FLO || align=right data-sort-value="0.64" | 640 m || 
|-id=978 bgcolor=#fefefe
| 385978 ||  || — || December 22, 2006 || Kitt Peak || Spacewatch || — || align=right data-sort-value="0.82" | 820 m || 
|-id=979 bgcolor=#fefefe
| 385979 ||  || — || December 22, 2006 || Socorro || LINEAR || — || align=right | 1.2 km || 
|-id=980 bgcolor=#fefefe
| 385980 Emiliosegrè ||  ||  || January 9, 2007 || Vallemare di Borbona || V. S. Casulli || NYS || align=right data-sort-value="0.56" | 560 m || 
|-id=981 bgcolor=#fefefe
| 385981 ||  || — || January 10, 2007 || Mount Lemmon || Mount Lemmon Survey || — || align=right data-sort-value="0.73" | 730 m || 
|-id=982 bgcolor=#fefefe
| 385982 ||  || — || January 10, 2007 || Mount Lemmon || Mount Lemmon Survey || V || align=right data-sort-value="0.67" | 670 m || 
|-id=983 bgcolor=#fefefe
| 385983 ||  || — || January 10, 2007 || Mount Lemmon || Mount Lemmon Survey || — || align=right | 1.1 km || 
|-id=984 bgcolor=#fefefe
| 385984 ||  || — || January 24, 2007 || Mount Lemmon || Mount Lemmon Survey || FLO || align=right data-sort-value="0.72" | 720 m || 
|-id=985 bgcolor=#fefefe
| 385985 ||  || — || January 24, 2007 || Mount Lemmon || Mount Lemmon Survey || FLO || align=right data-sort-value="0.65" | 650 m || 
|-id=986 bgcolor=#fefefe
| 385986 ||  || — || January 26, 2007 || Kitt Peak || Spacewatch || MAS || align=right data-sort-value="0.63" | 630 m || 
|-id=987 bgcolor=#fefefe
| 385987 ||  || — || January 17, 2007 || Kitt Peak || Spacewatch || — || align=right data-sort-value="0.98" | 980 m || 
|-id=988 bgcolor=#fefefe
| 385988 ||  || — || January 27, 2007 || Mount Lemmon || Mount Lemmon Survey || — || align=right data-sort-value="0.82" | 820 m || 
|-id=989 bgcolor=#fefefe
| 385989 ||  || — || January 17, 2007 || Kitt Peak || Spacewatch || — || align=right data-sort-value="0.68" | 680 m || 
|-id=990 bgcolor=#fefefe
| 385990 ||  || — || January 17, 2007 || Kitt Peak || Spacewatch || — || align=right | 1.0 km || 
|-id=991 bgcolor=#fefefe
| 385991 ||  || — || January 29, 2007 || Kitt Peak || Spacewatch || — || align=right data-sort-value="0.74" | 740 m || 
|-id=992 bgcolor=#fefefe
| 385992 ||  || — || January 27, 2007 || Kitt Peak || Spacewatch || — || align=right data-sort-value="0.66" | 660 m || 
|-id=993 bgcolor=#fefefe
| 385993 ||  || — || January 28, 2007 || Mount Lemmon || Mount Lemmon Survey || NYS || align=right data-sort-value="0.66" | 660 m || 
|-id=994 bgcolor=#fefefe
| 385994 ||  || — || December 27, 2006 || Mount Lemmon || Mount Lemmon Survey || V || align=right data-sort-value="0.77" | 770 m || 
|-id=995 bgcolor=#fefefe
| 385995 ||  || — || February 6, 2007 || Mount Lemmon || Mount Lemmon Survey || — || align=right data-sort-value="0.70" | 700 m || 
|-id=996 bgcolor=#fefefe
| 385996 ||  || — || February 7, 2007 || Mount Lemmon || Mount Lemmon Survey || NYS || align=right data-sort-value="0.53" | 530 m || 
|-id=997 bgcolor=#fefefe
| 385997 ||  || — || February 6, 2007 || Mount Lemmon || Mount Lemmon Survey || — || align=right data-sort-value="0.64" | 640 m || 
|-id=998 bgcolor=#fefefe
| 385998 ||  || — || February 7, 2007 || Mount Lemmon || Mount Lemmon Survey || — || align=right data-sort-value="0.72" | 720 m || 
|-id=999 bgcolor=#fefefe
| 385999 ||  || — || February 7, 2007 || Mount Lemmon || Mount Lemmon Survey || — || align=right data-sort-value="0.94" | 940 m || 
|-id=000 bgcolor=#fefefe
| 386000 ||  || — || February 8, 2007 || Palomar || NEAT || — || align=right data-sort-value="0.68" | 680 m || 
|}

References

External links 
 Discovery Circumstances: Numbered Minor Planets (385001)–(390000) (IAU Minor Planet Center)

0385